= Radziwiłł Chronicle =

15th-century chronicle

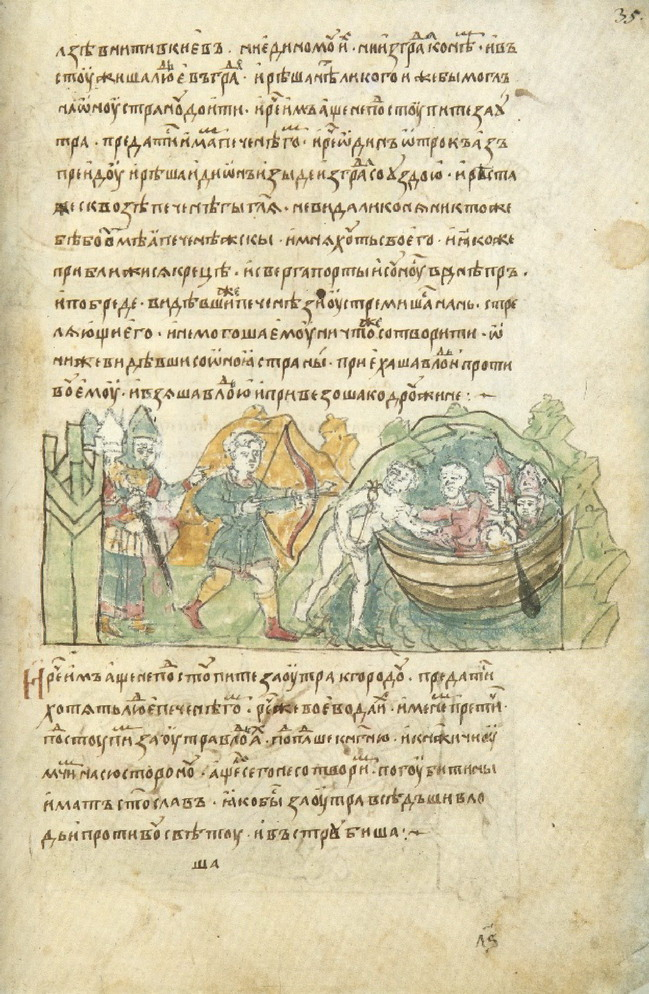
Saint Petersburg, Library of the Russian Academy of Sciences, 34.5.30, fol. 68

The Radziwiłł Chronicle, also known as the Königsberg Chronicle, is a 15th-century collection of illuminated manuscripts, believed to be a copy of a 13th-century original. Its name derives from the Radziwiłł family of the Grand Duchy of Lithuania (later the Polish–Lithuanian Commonwealth), who kept the manuscript in their Nesvizh Castle during the 17th and 18th centuries. The Radziwiłł manuscript was removed from Königsberg in 1761 and acquired by the Library of the Russian Academy of Sciences in Saint Petersburg, where it is currently preserved under the registration number 34.5.30. The chronicle recounts the history of Kievan Rus' and its neighbours from the 5th century to the early 13th century in pictorial form, illustrating the narrative with more than 600 colour miniatures. Among East Slavic chronicles, the Radziwiłł Chronicle is distinguished by the richness and quantity of its illustrations, which may ultimately derive from the 13th-century prototype.

== Contents ==
The Radziwiłł Chronicle (Rad.) has the following textual structure:

- a copy of the Primary Chronicle (Povest' vremmenykh let' (PVL), "Tale of Bygone Years") until the year 1116, the text of which groups it with the Laurentian Codex (Lav.), the Academic Chronicle (Aka.), and the remnants of the lost Trinity Chronicle (Tro.);
- a text similar to the Kievan Chronicle from 1118 to the mid-1170s, also known as the "southern Rus' source" (sometimes considered part of the Suzdalian Chronicle in the broadest sense);
- a copy of the Suzdalian Chronicle from the mid-1170s to 1203, the text of which has been very similarly preserved in the Laurentian Codex (Lav.), the Academic Chronicle (Aka.), and the Chronicler of Pereyaslavl-Suzdal (LPS); and
- a continuation from 1203 until the year 1206; a virtually identical continuation for 1203–1206 has preserved in the Academic Chronicle (Aka.). This text is based on records of the city of Vladimir on the Klyazma.
- Primary Chronicle (PVL)
- Southern Rus' sources (similar to Kievan Chronicle)
- Suzdalian Chronicle
- Laurentian continuation of the Suzdalian Chronicle
- Radziwiłł Chronicle continuation of the Suzdalian Chronicle
- Sofia First Chronicle (S1L)
- Tver Codex of 1305
- lost leaves of surviving manuscripts

== Gallery ==
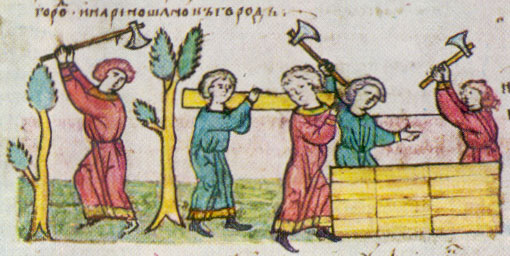
Novgorod Slavs building Novgorod

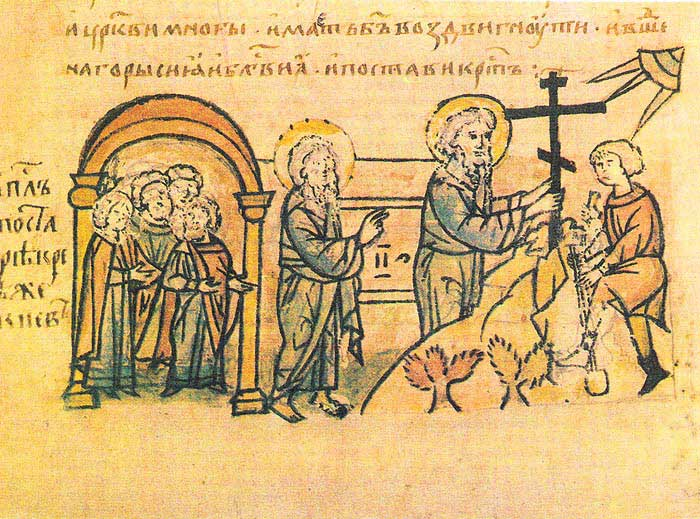
Saint Andrew's prophecy of the rise of Kiev

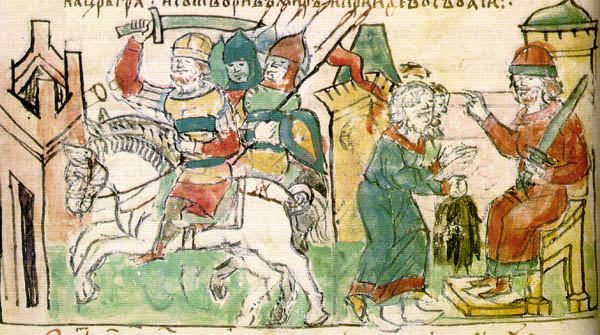
Igor of Kiev levying tribute from the Drevlians
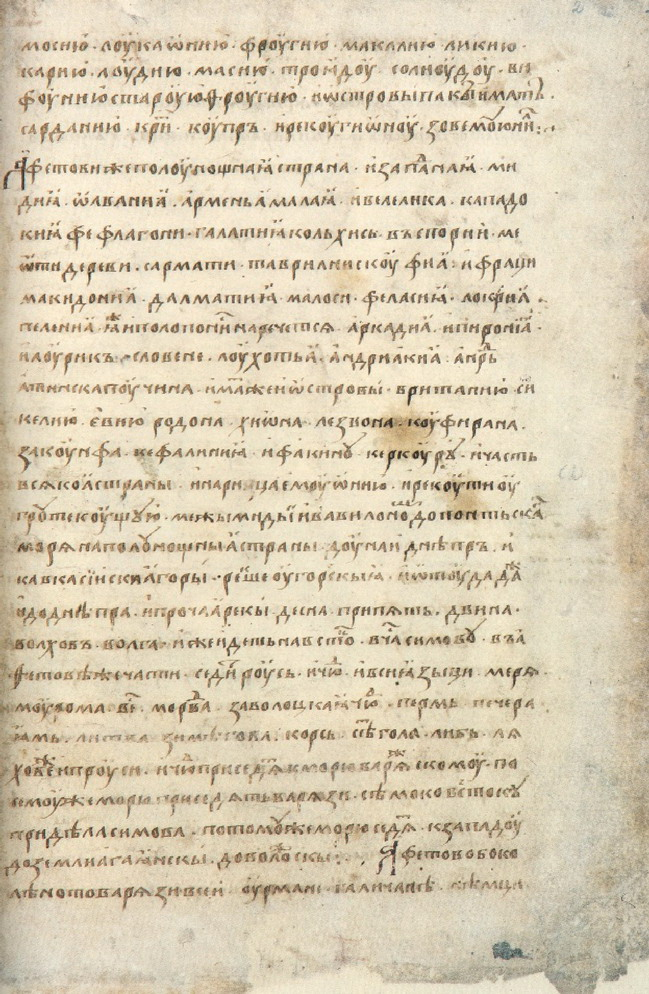
002

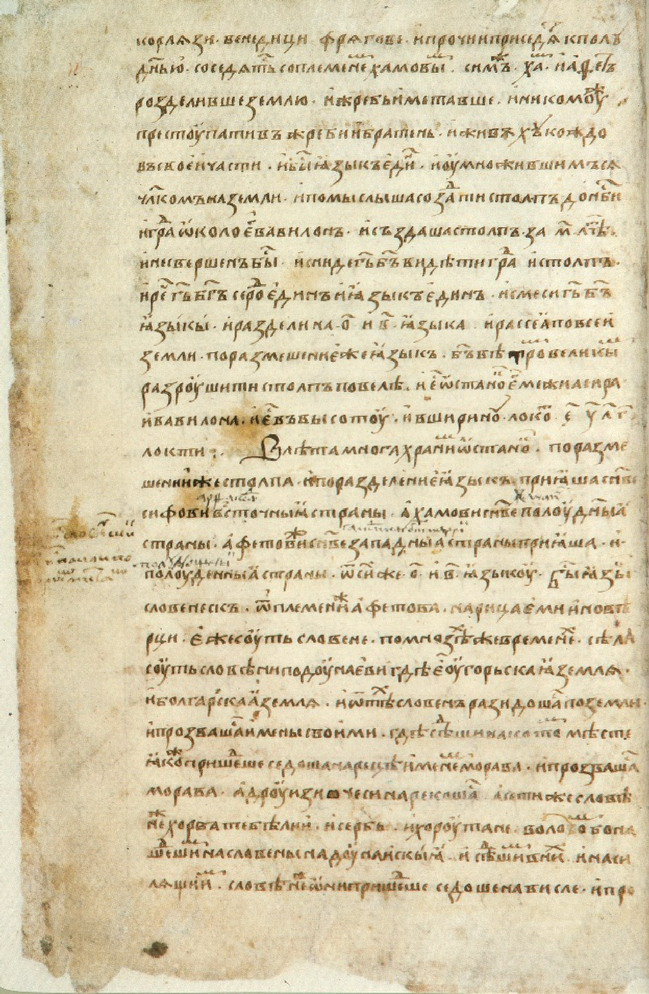
003

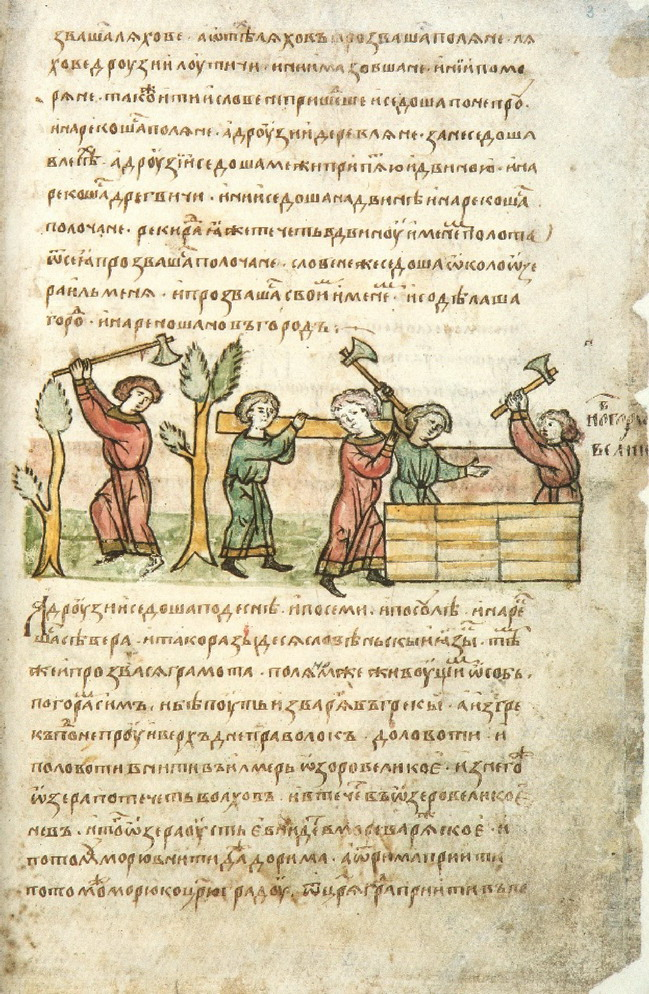
004

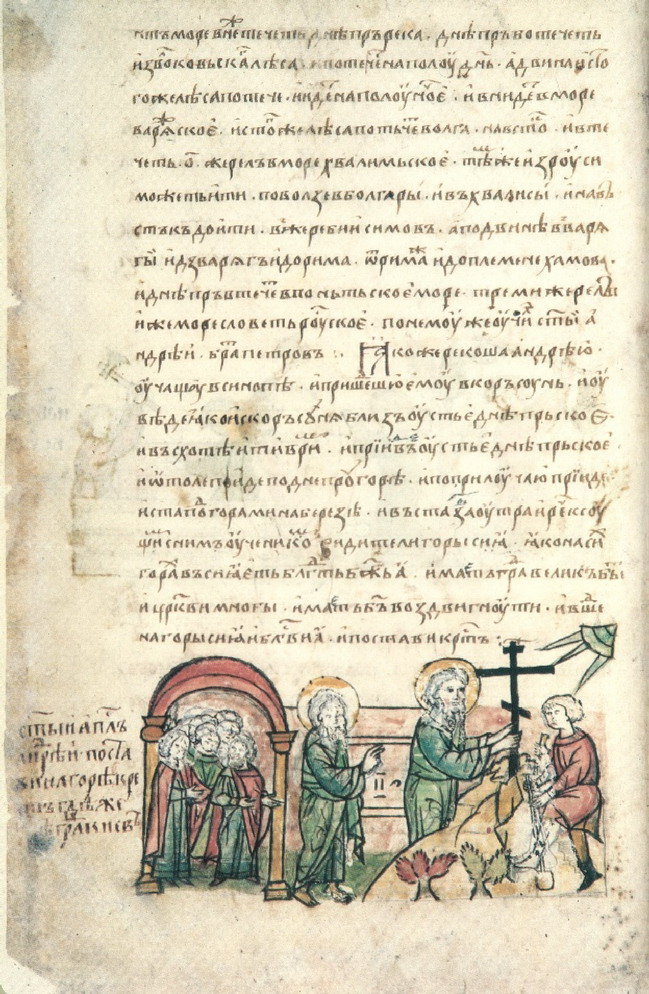
005

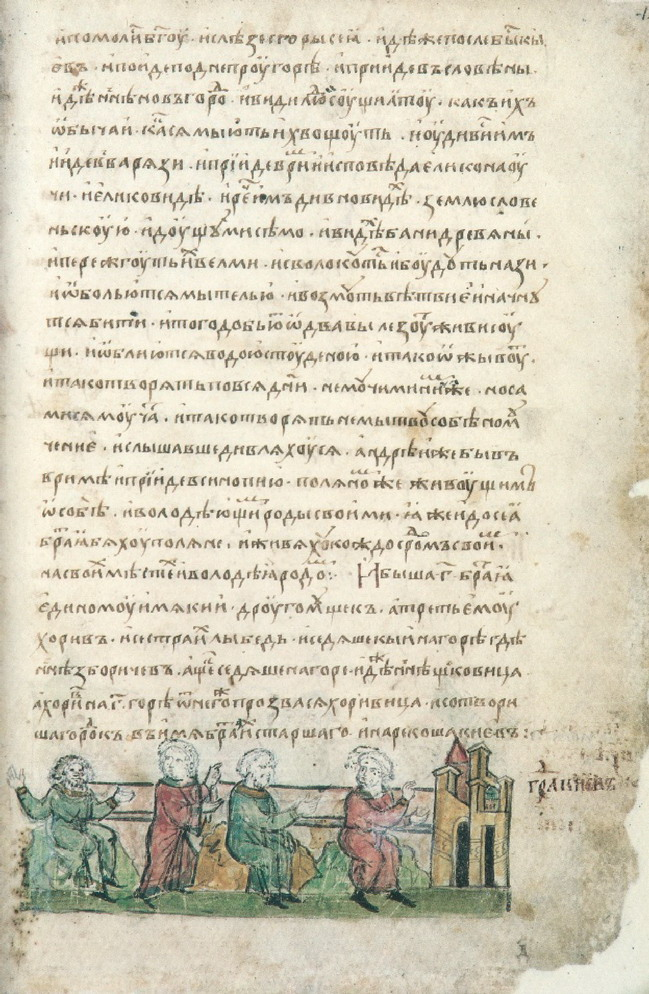
006

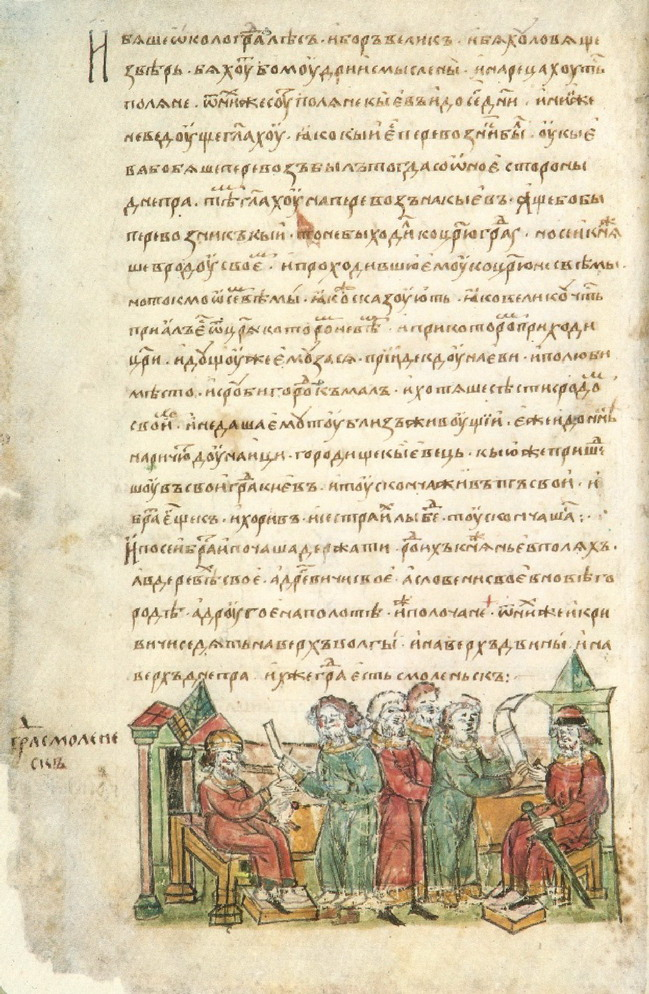
007

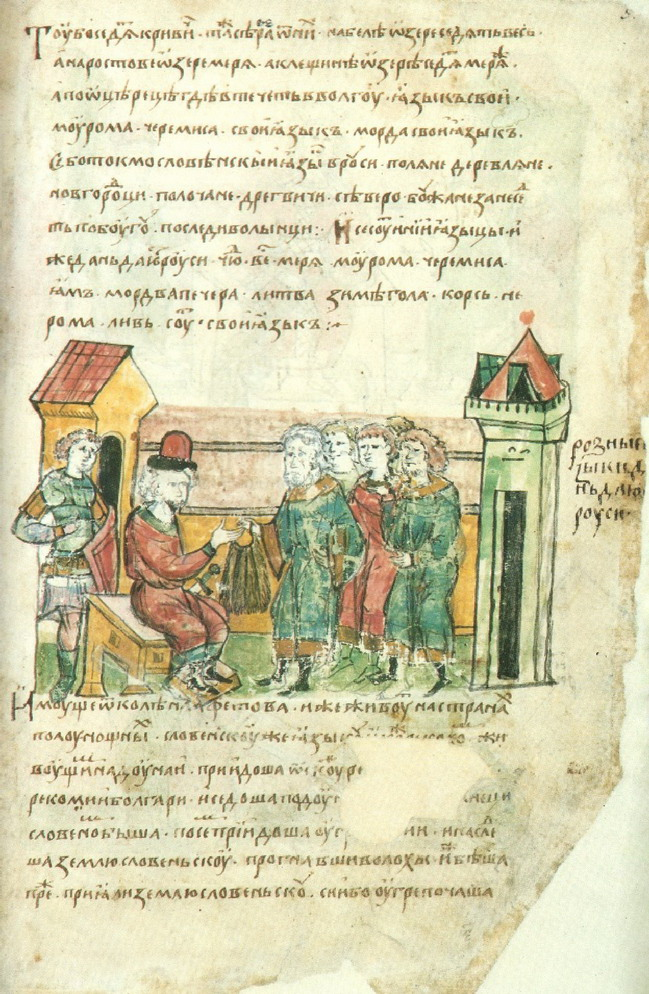
008

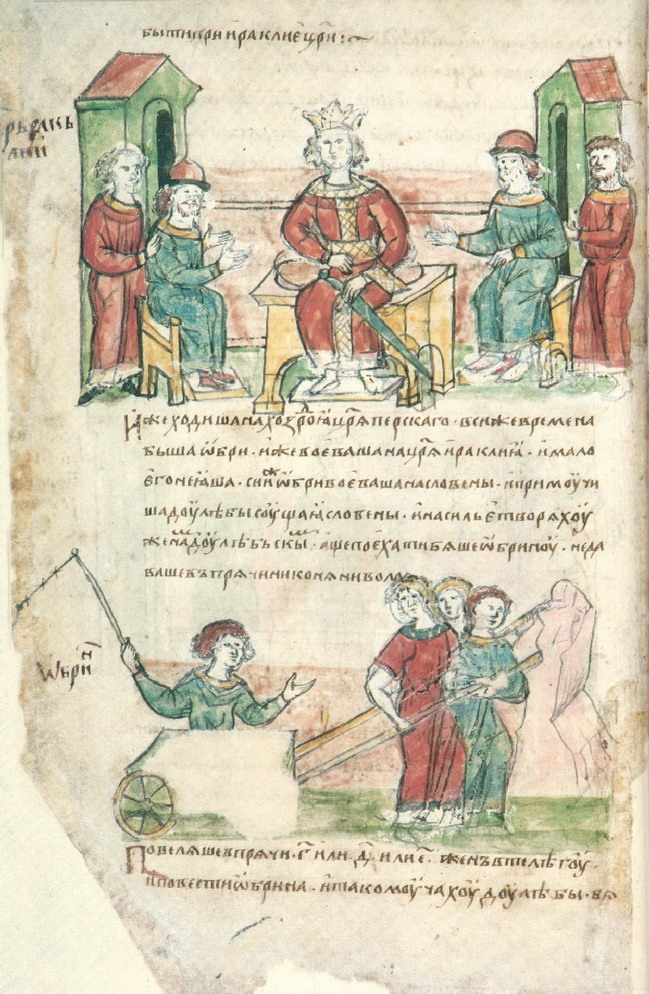
009

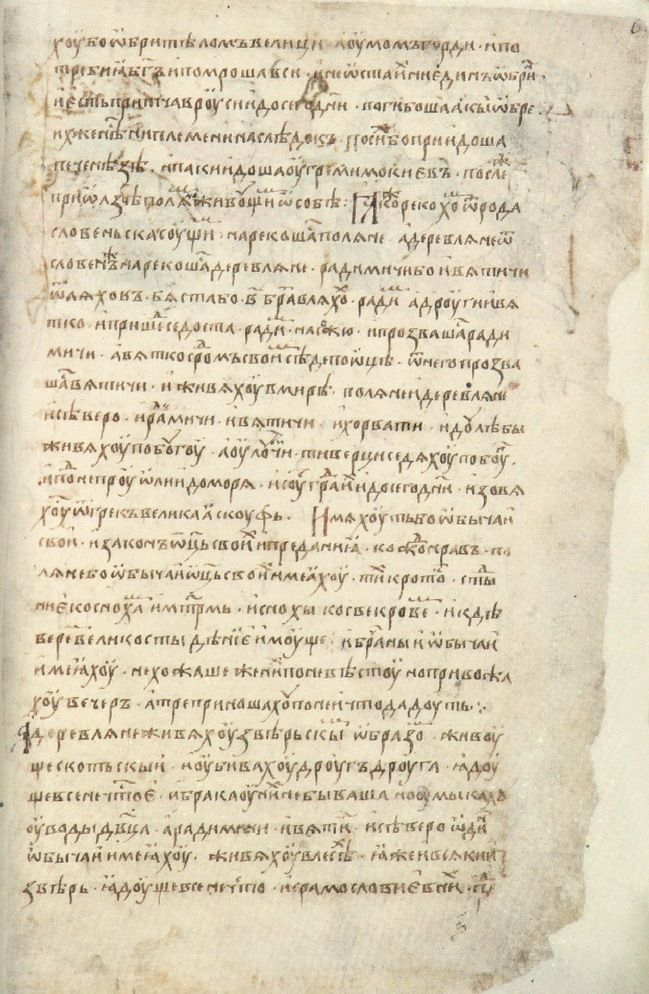
010

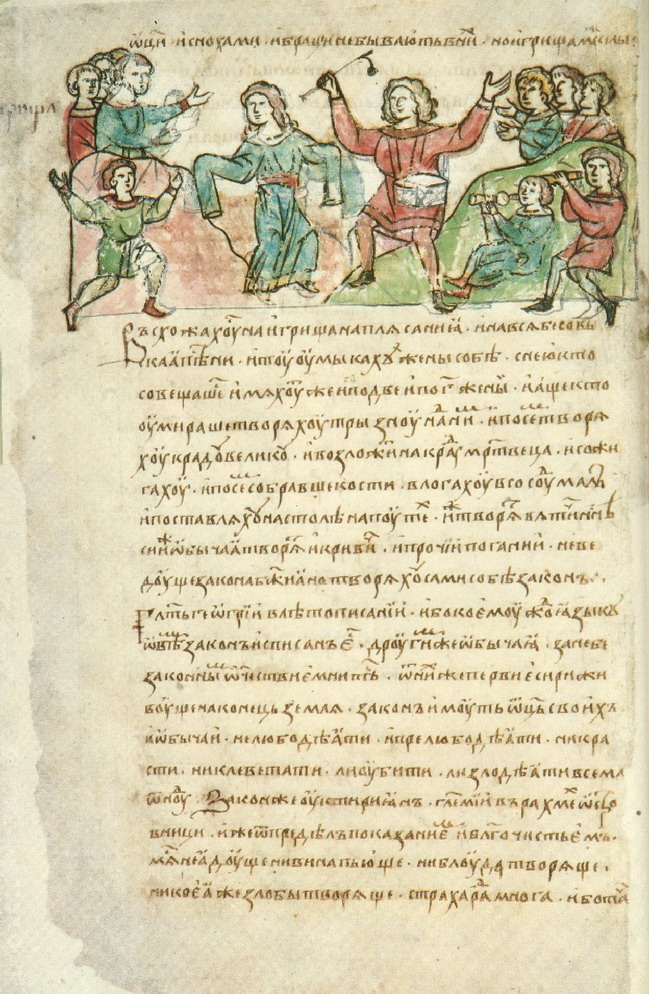
011

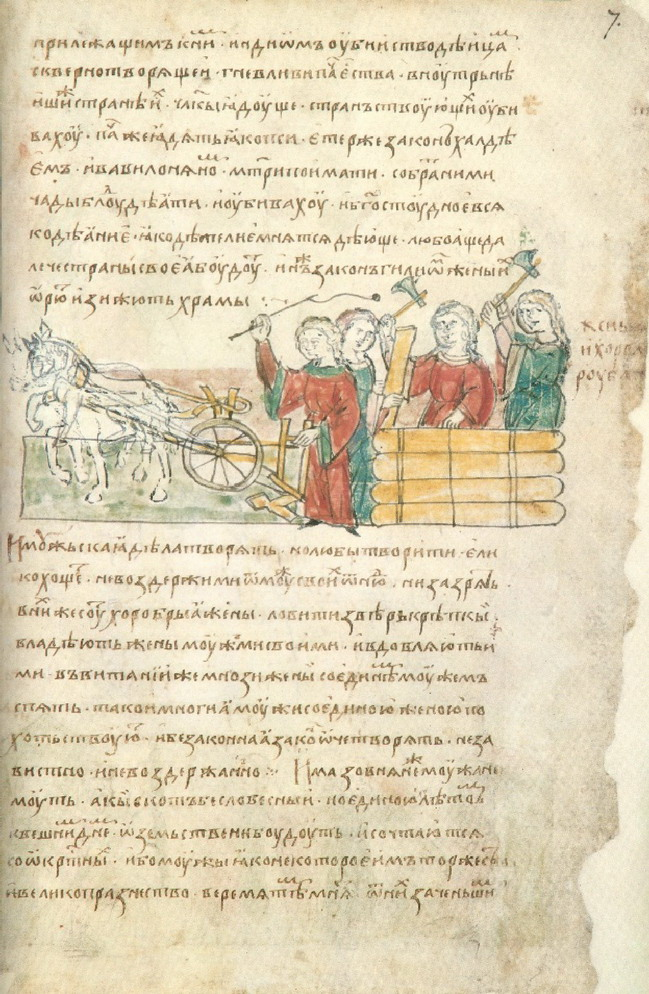
012

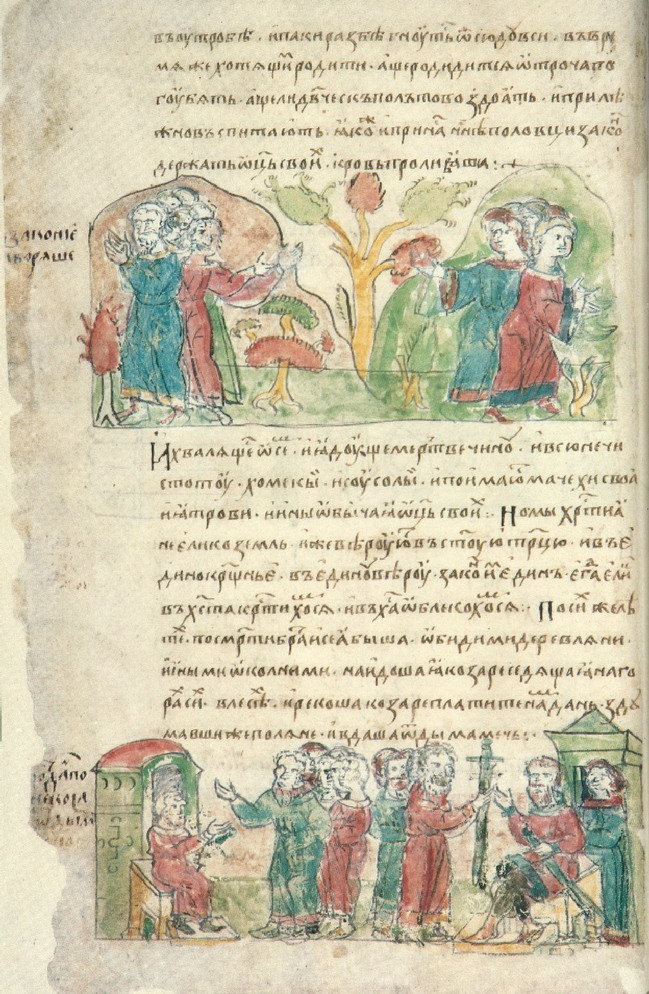
013

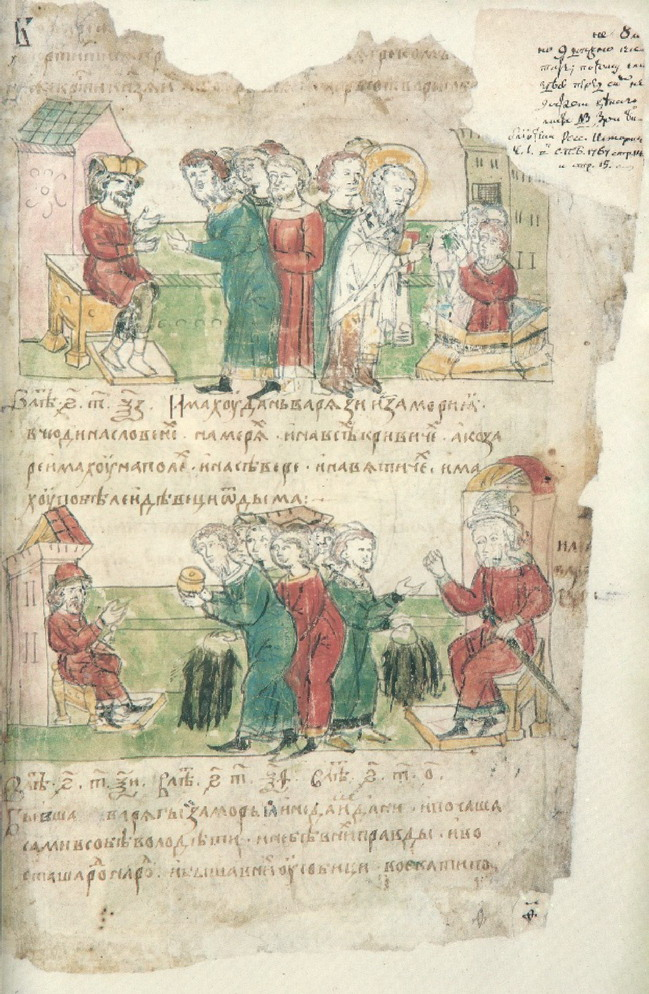
014

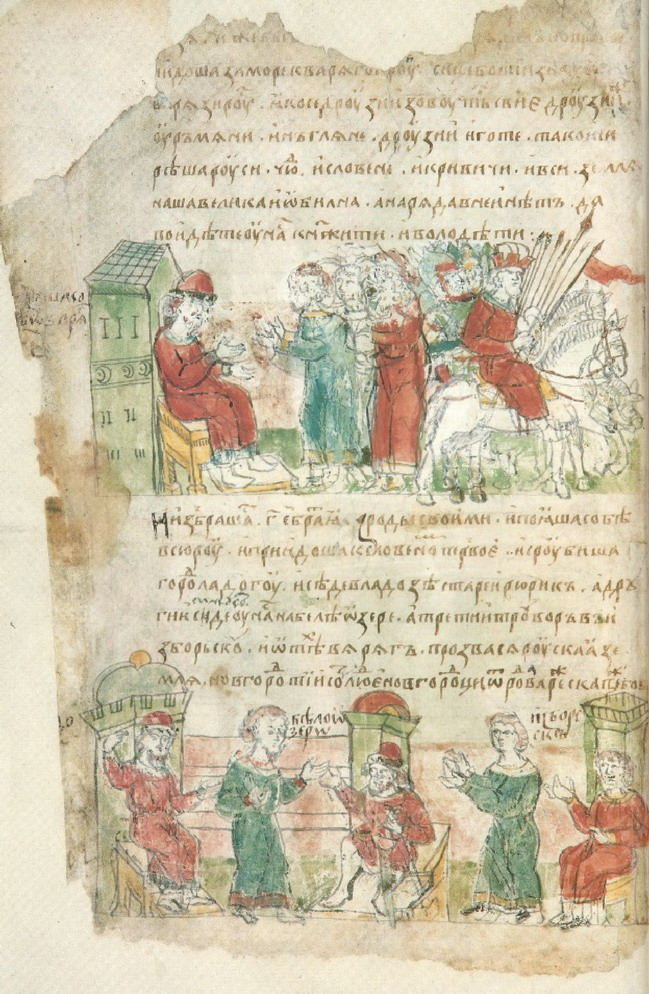
015

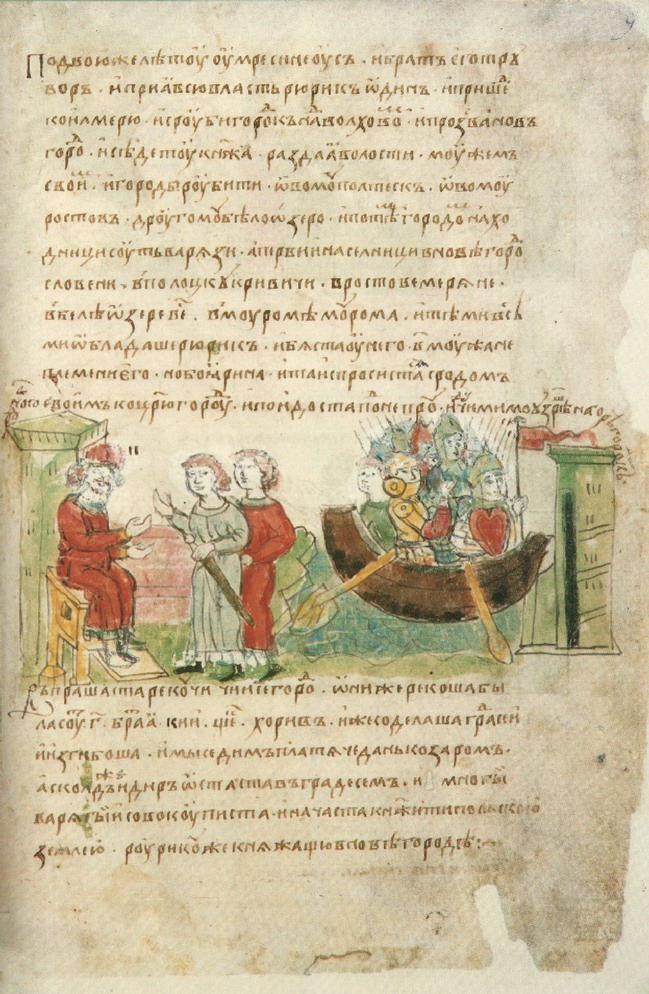
016

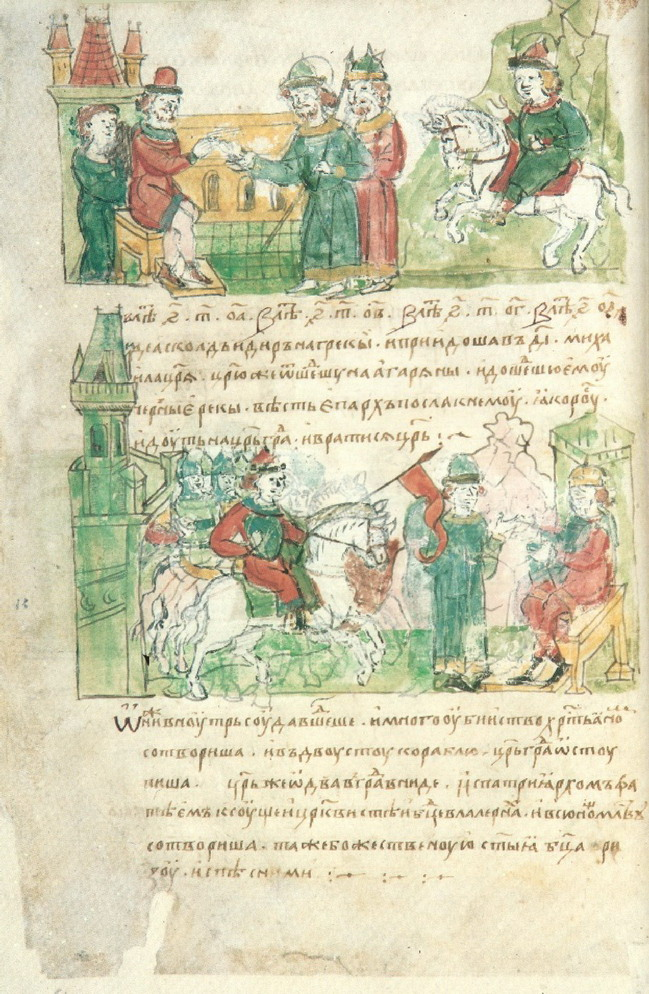
017

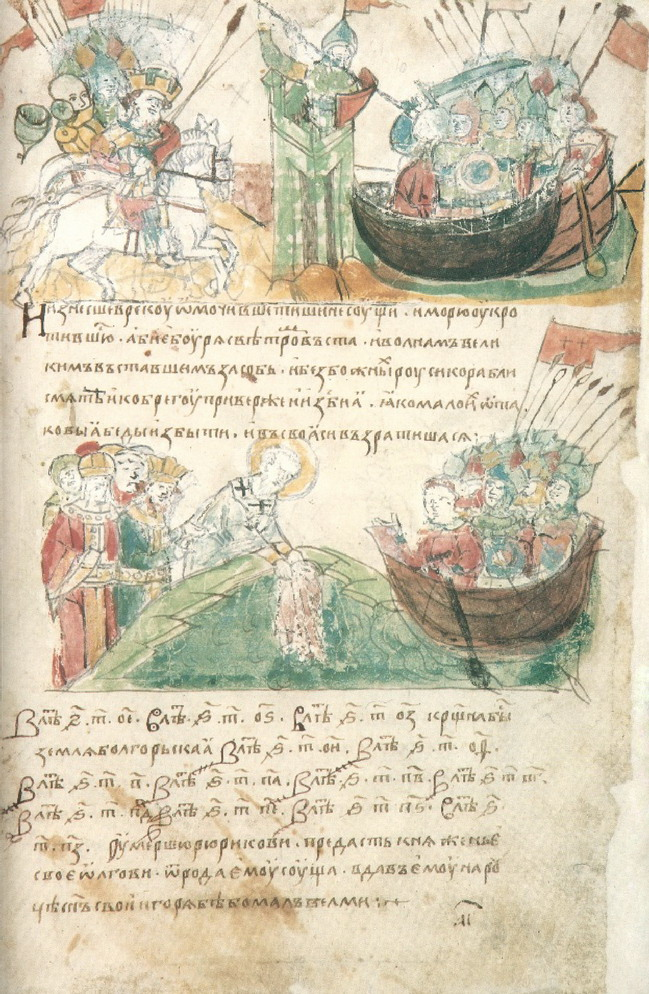
018

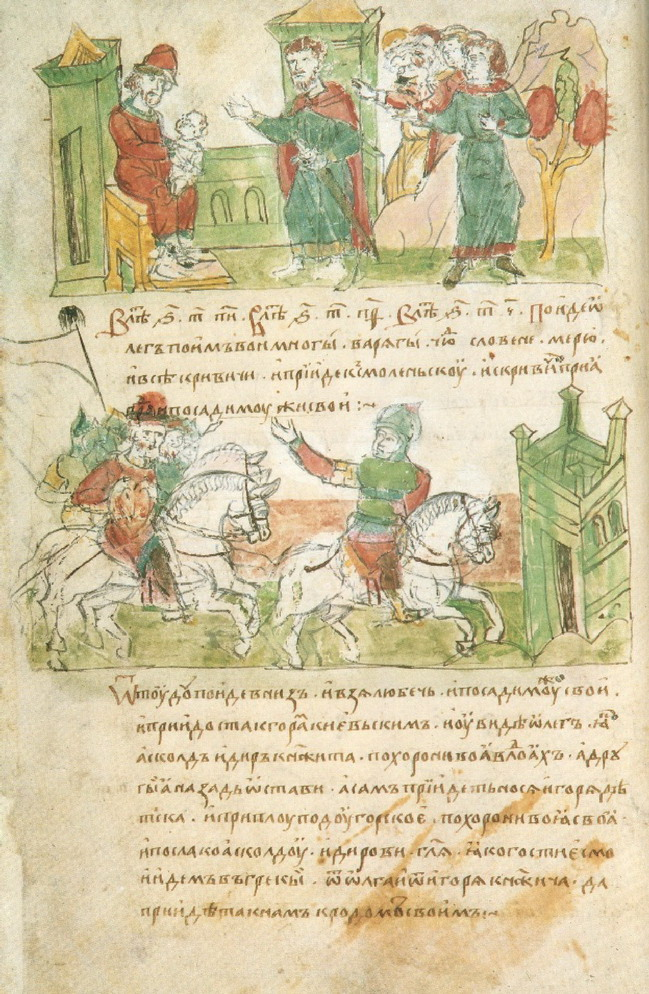
019

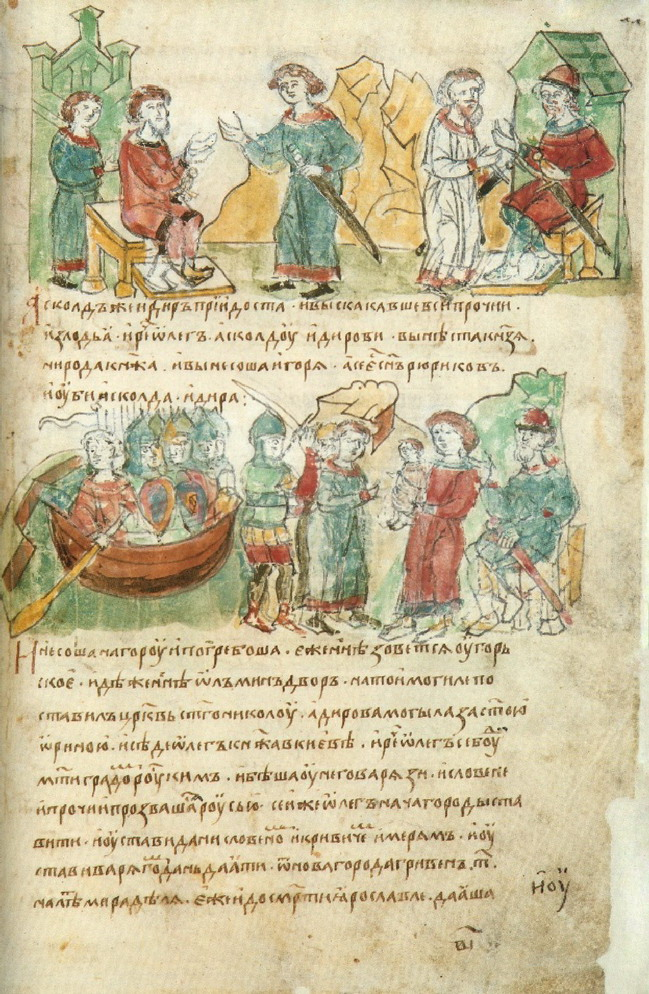
020

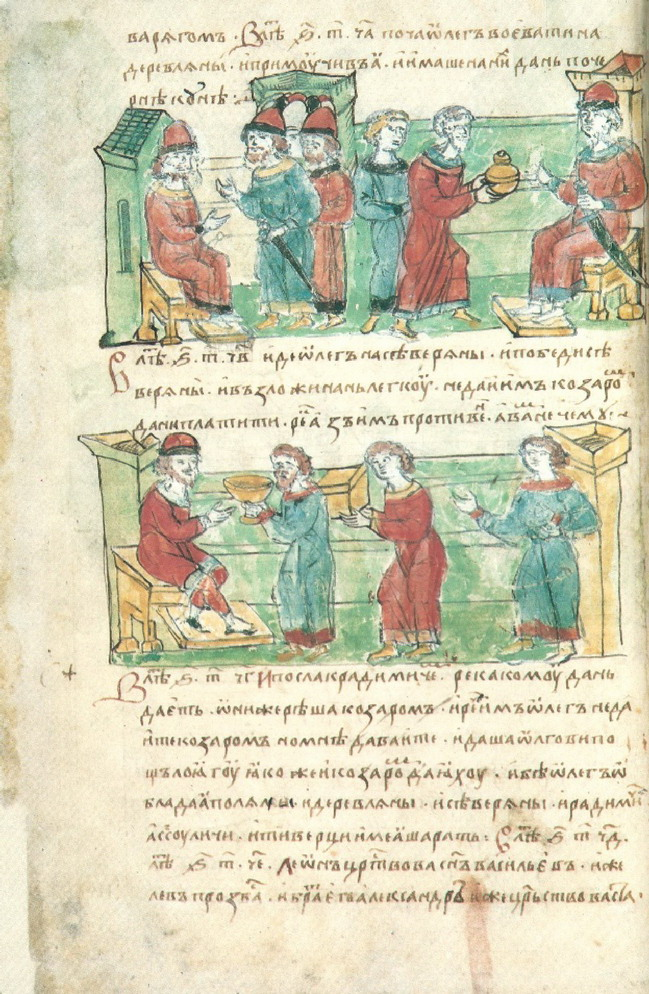
021

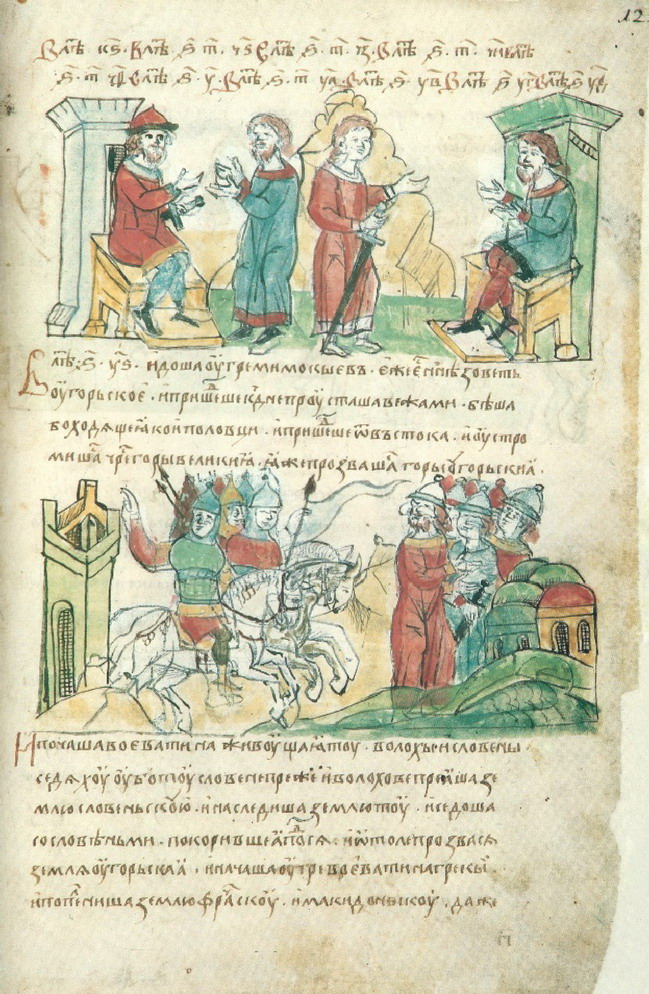
022

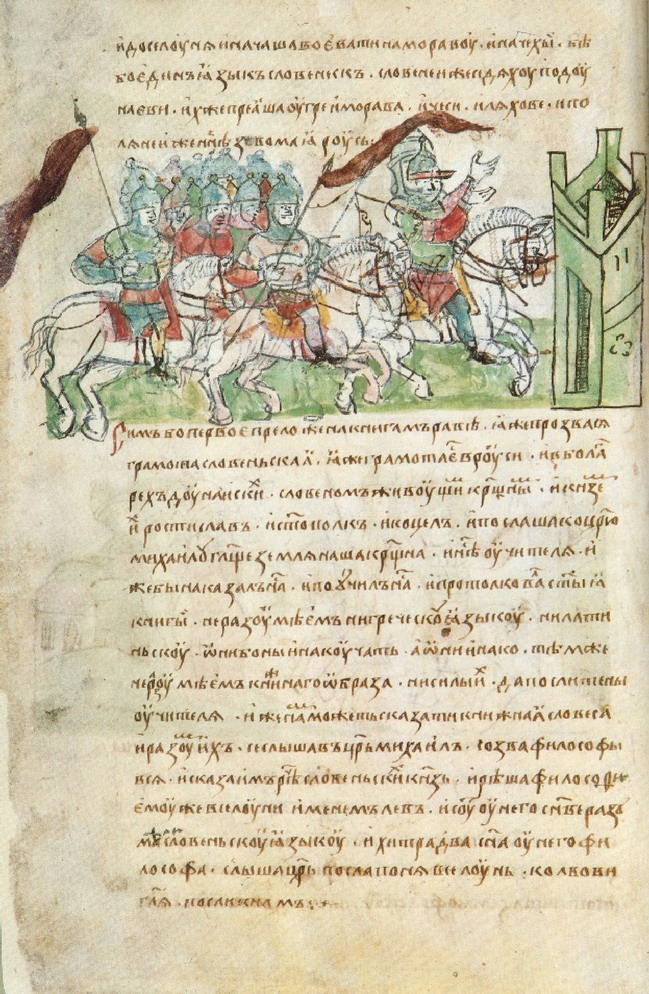
023

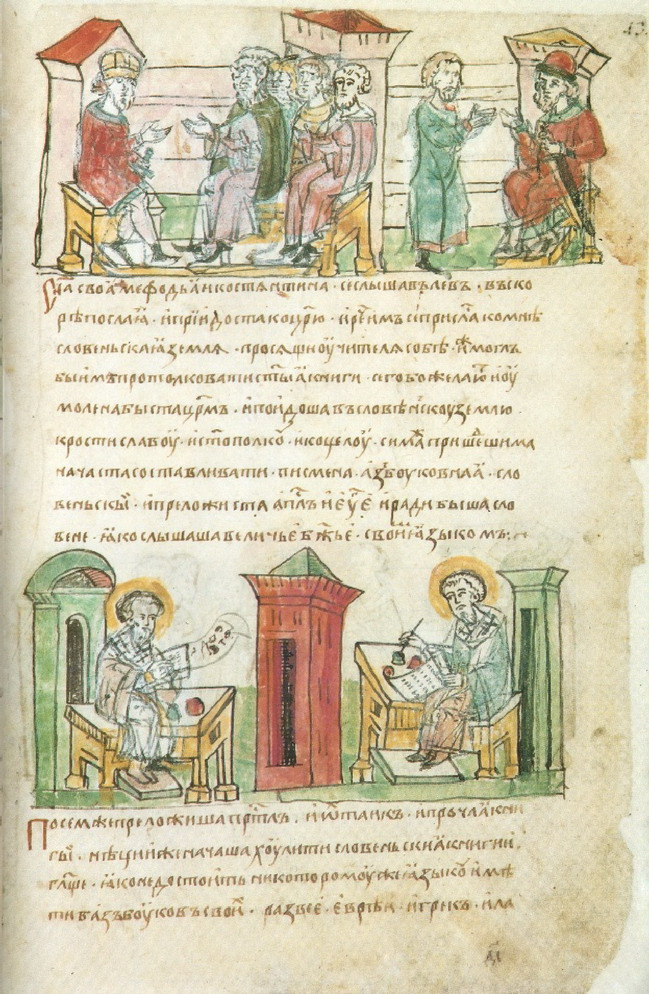
024

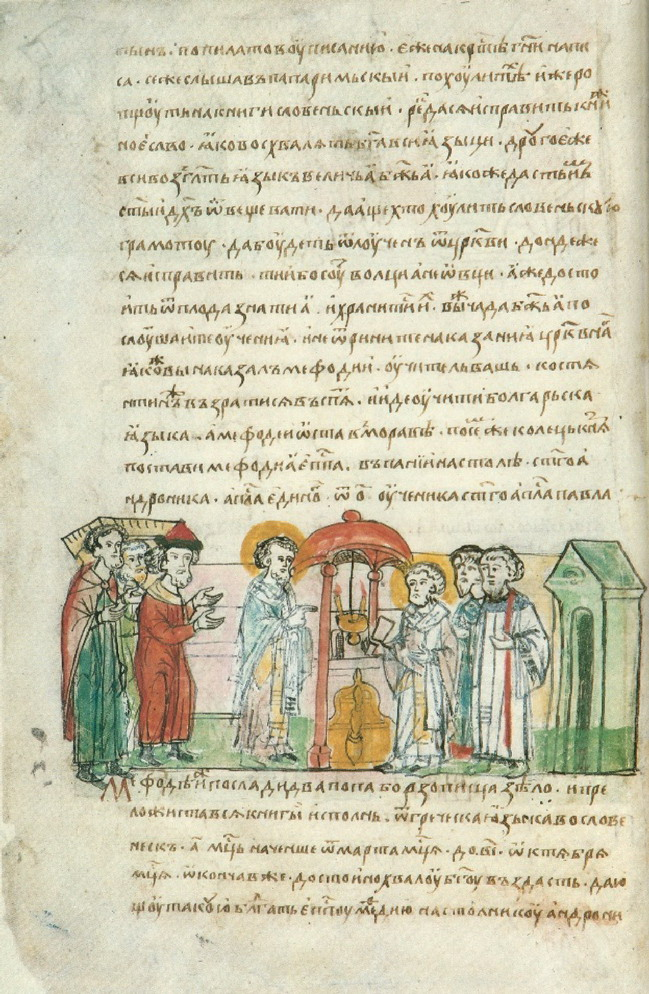
025

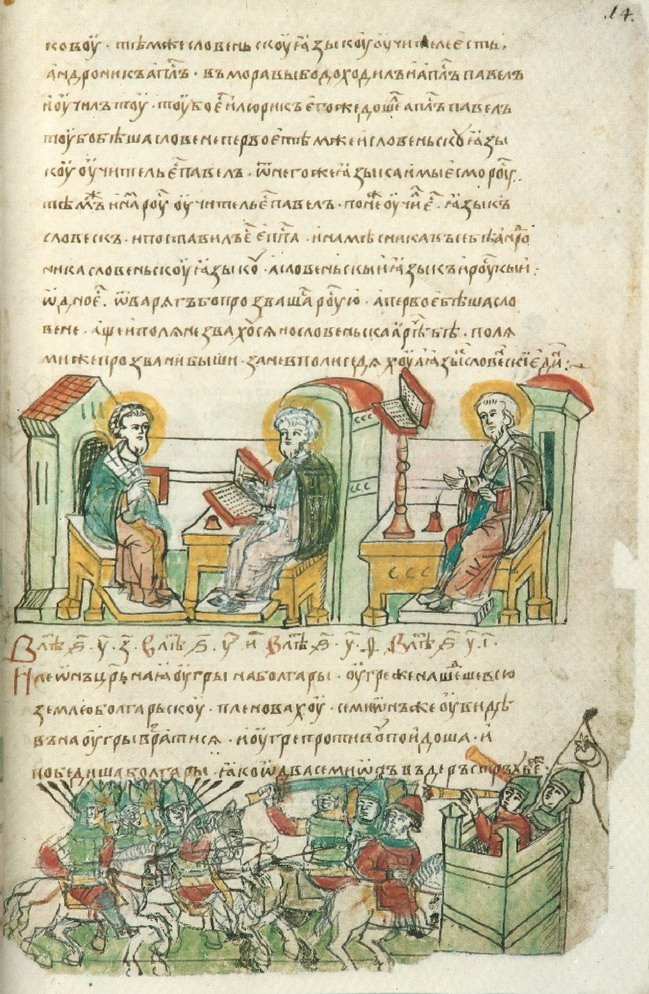
026

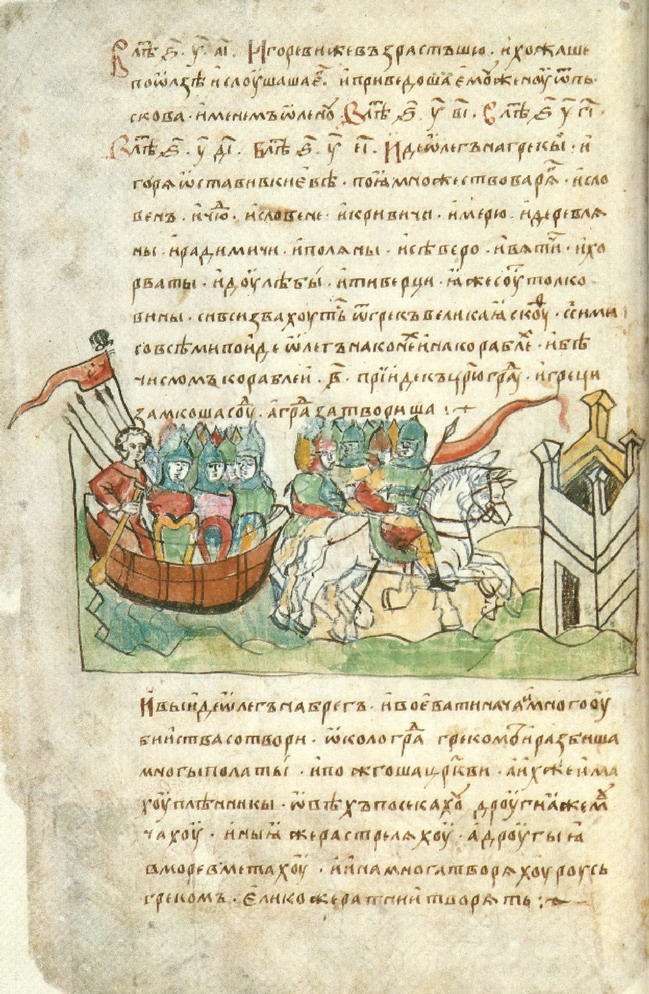
027

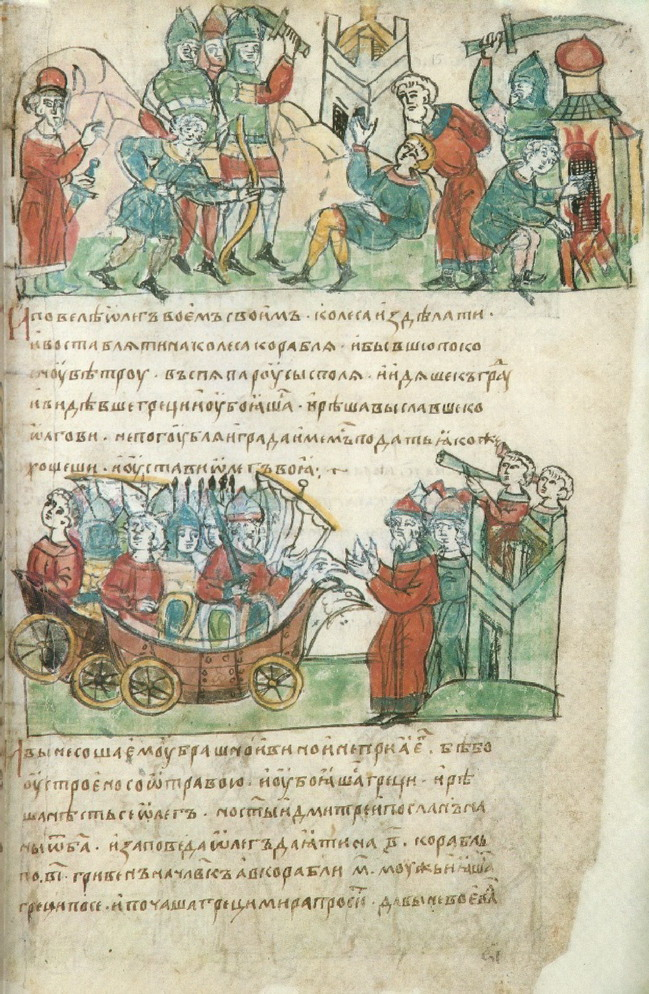
028

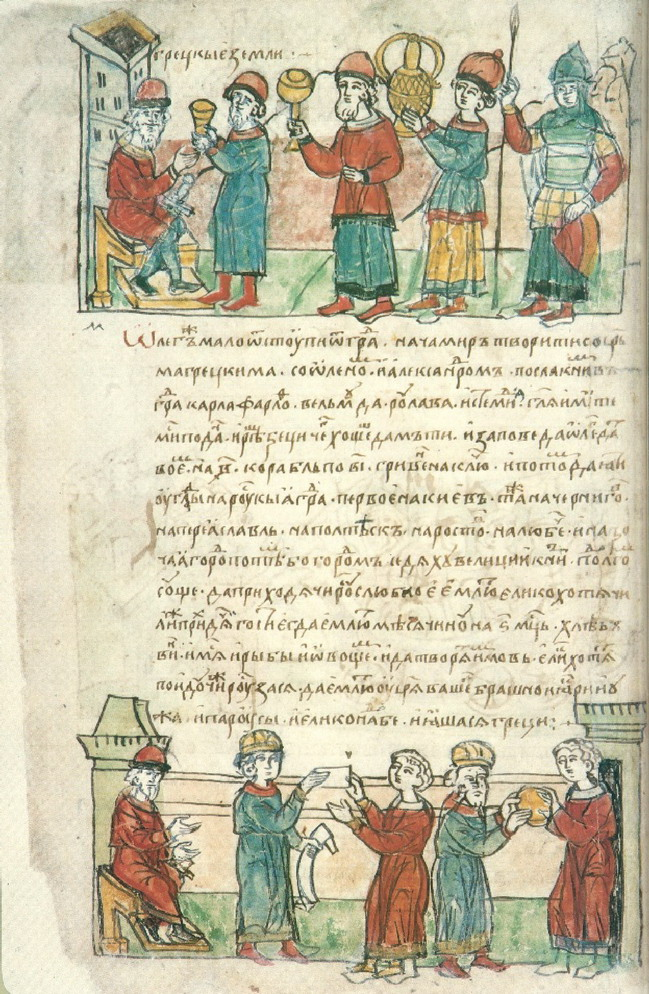
029

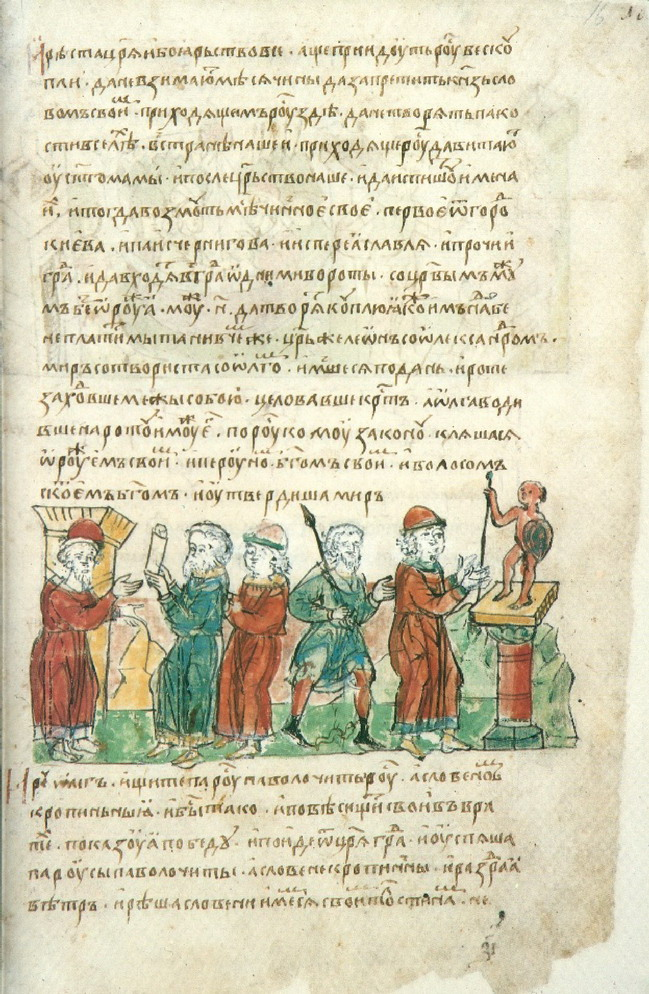
030

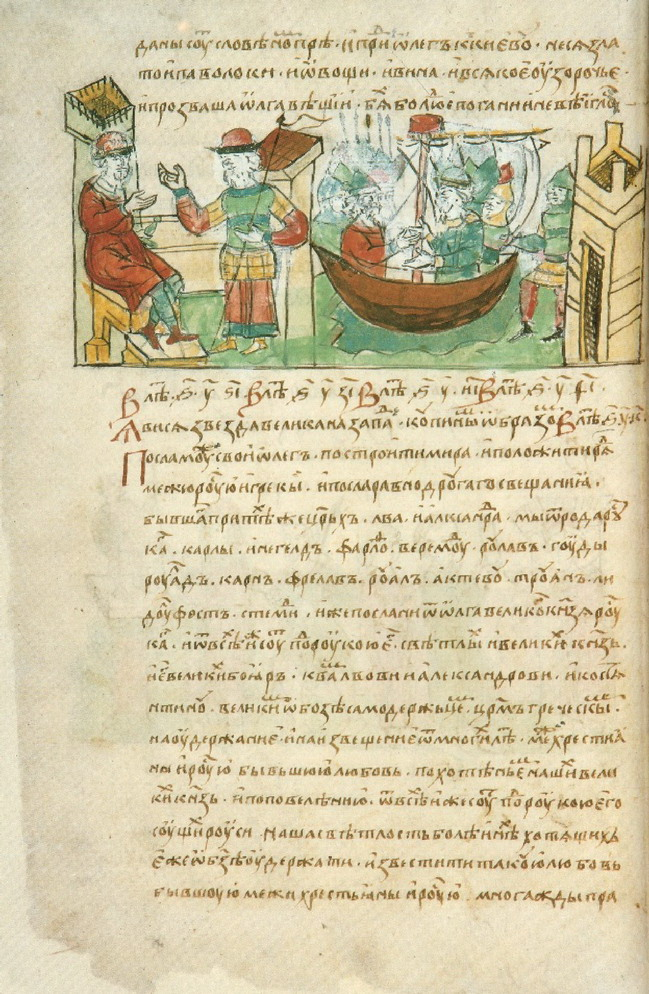
031

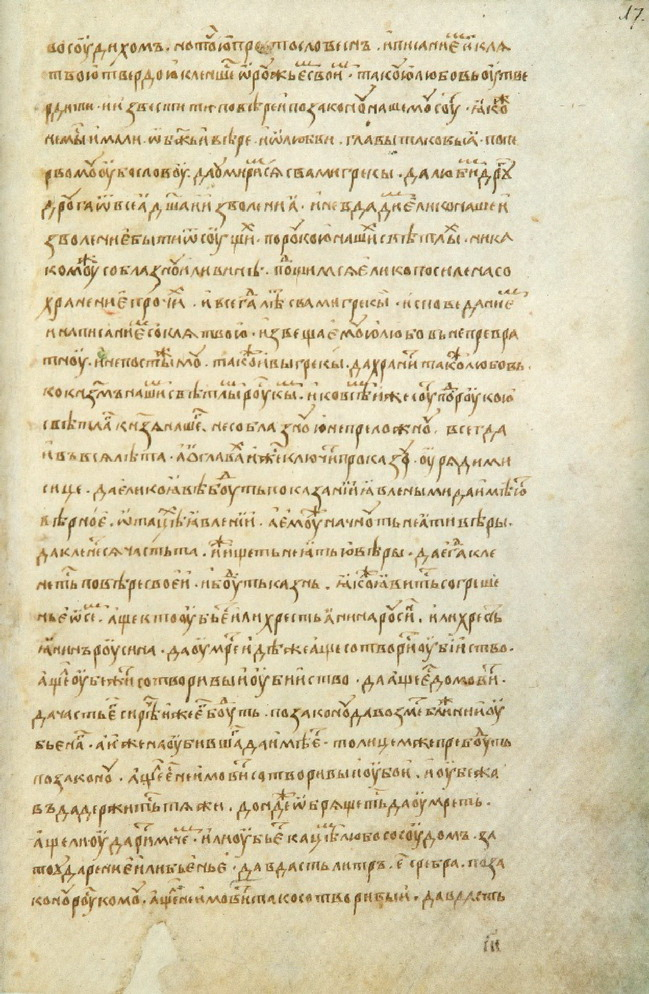
032

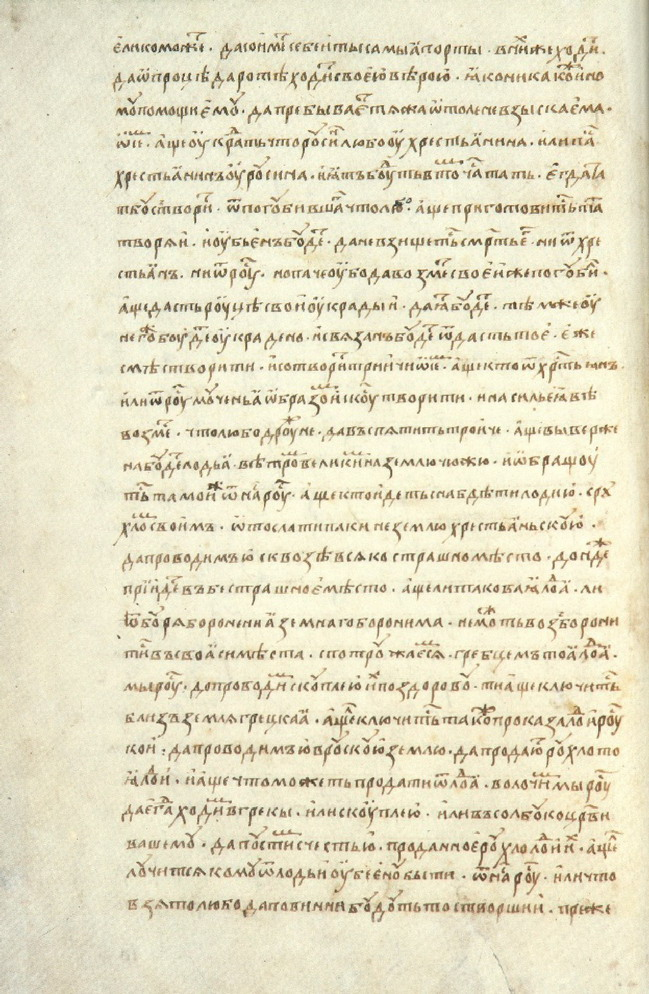
033

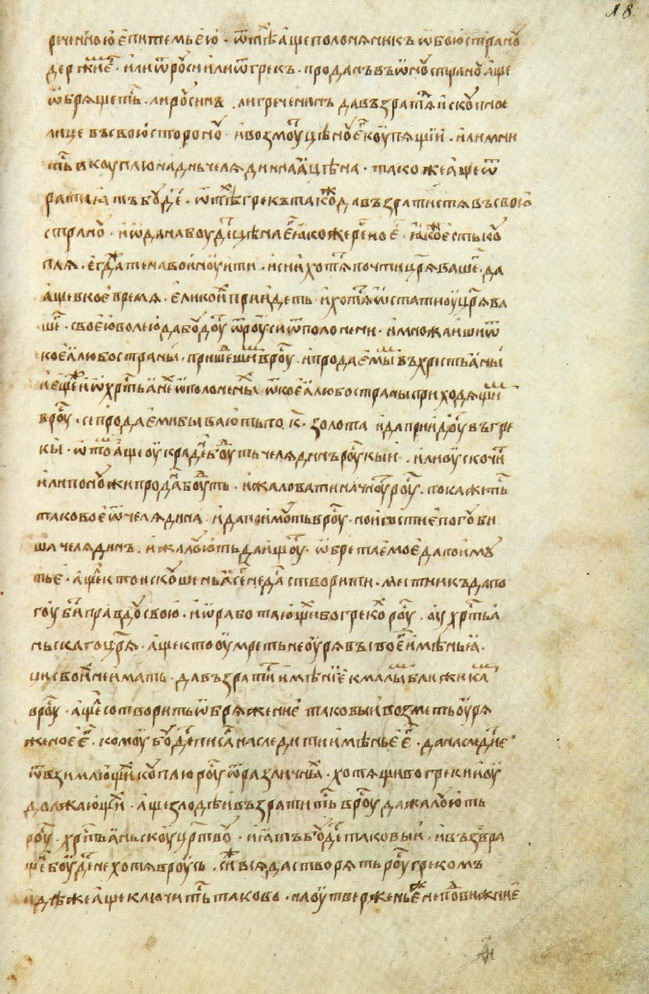
034

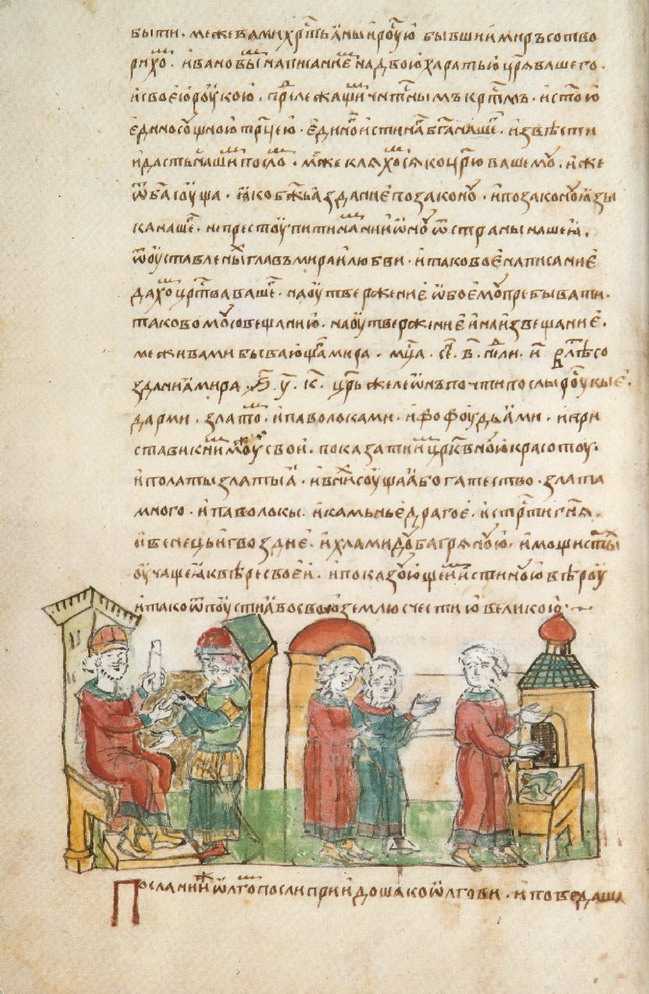
035

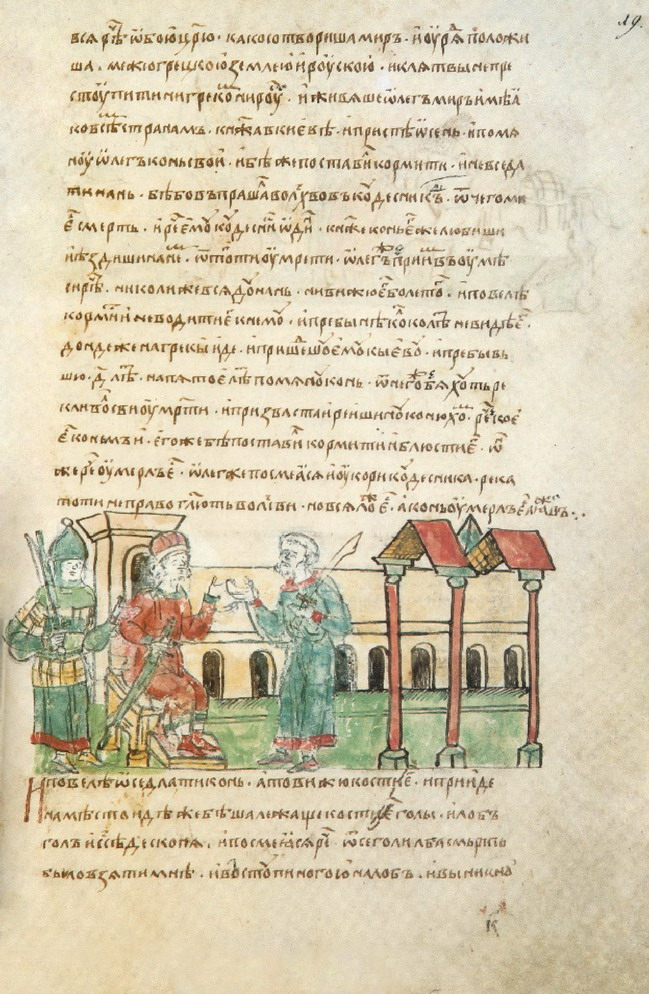
036

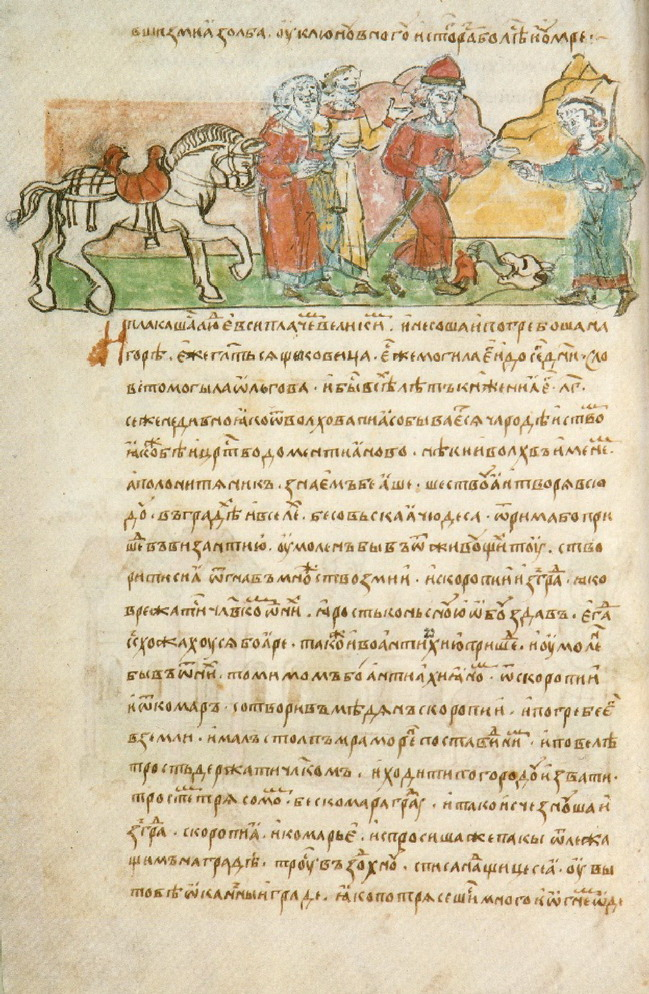
037

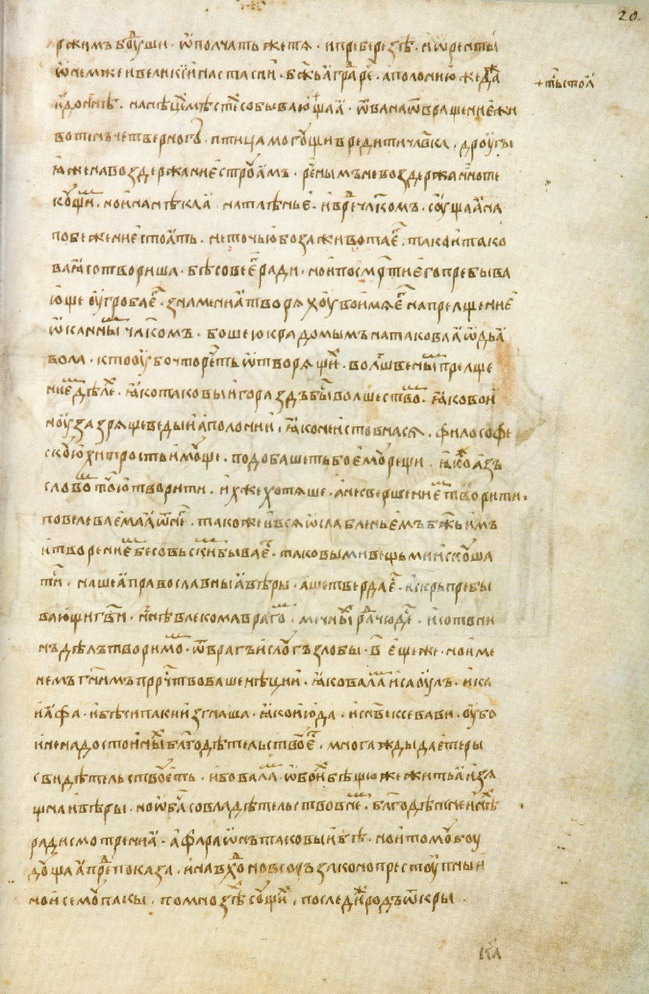
038

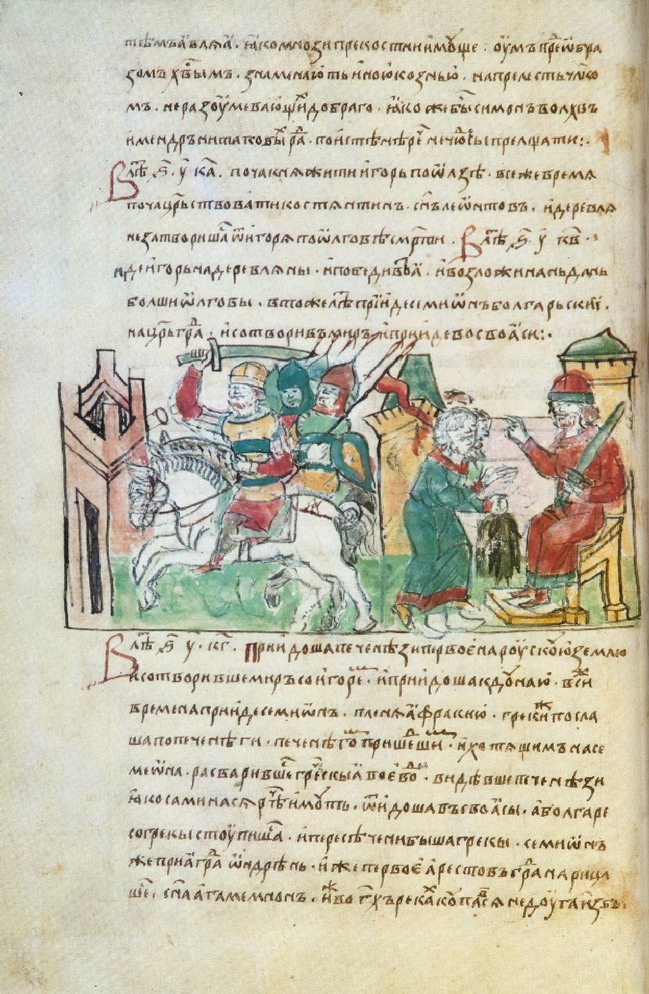
039

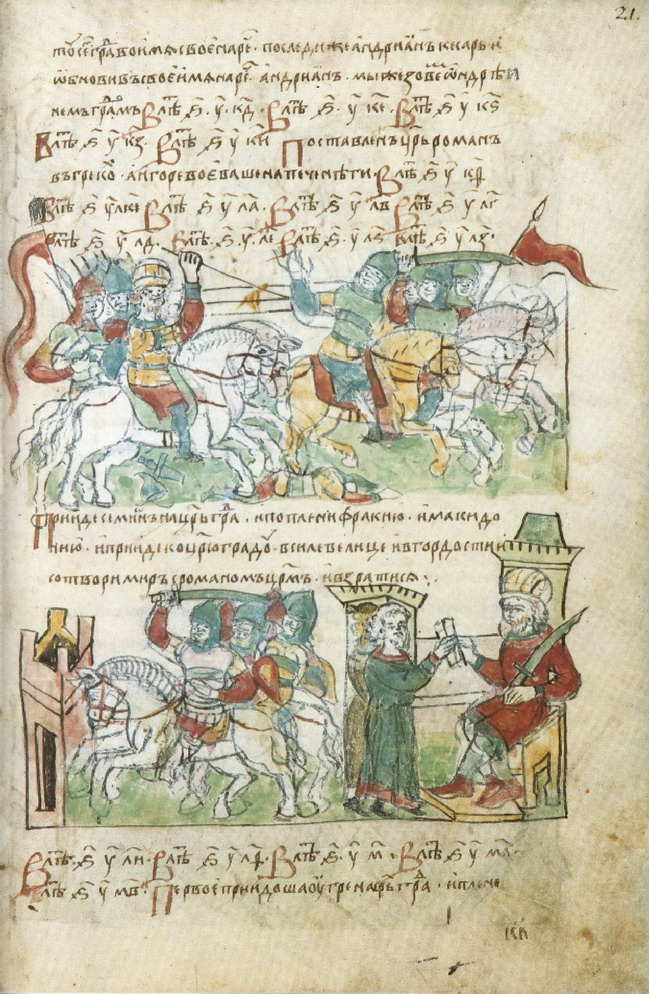
040

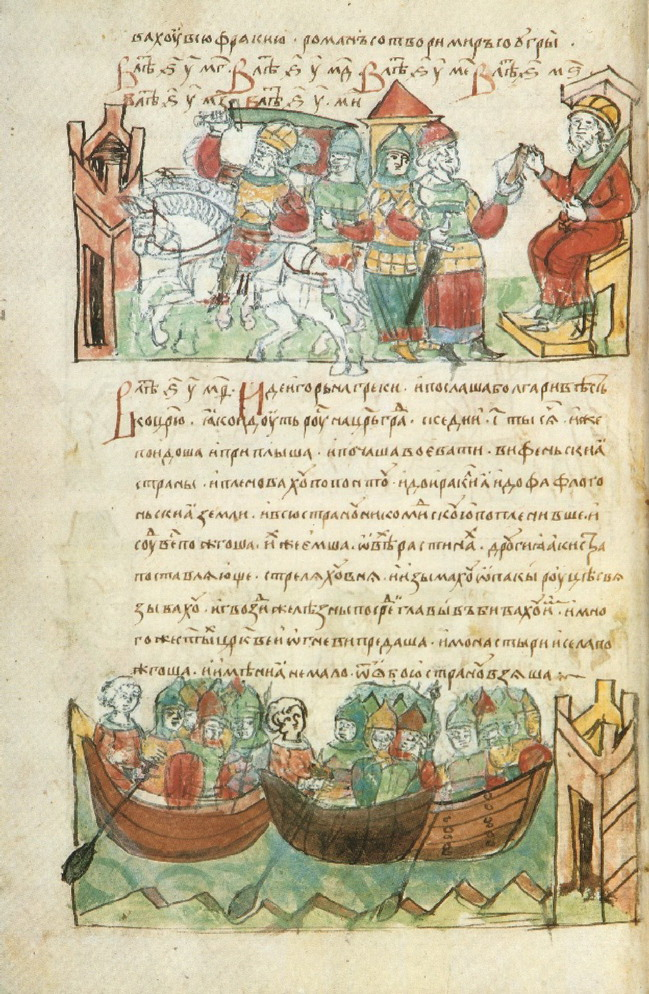
041

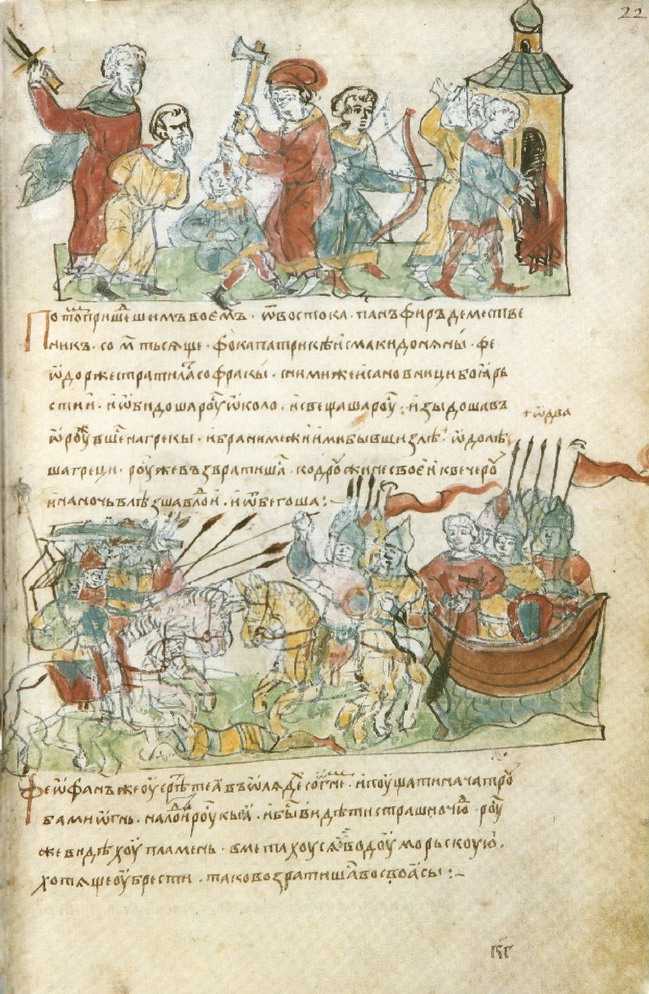
042

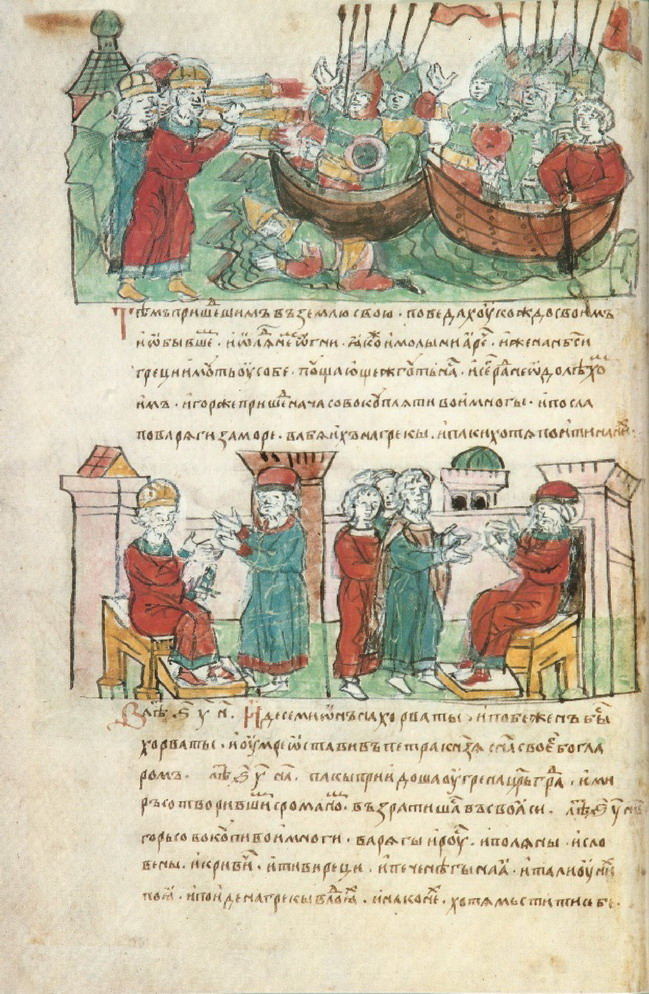
043

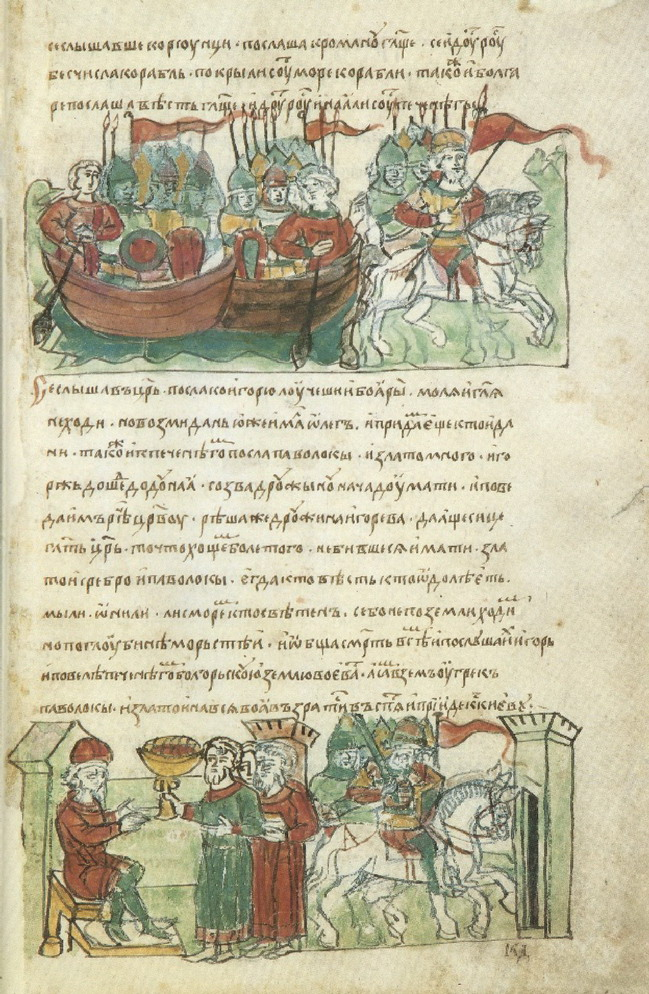
044

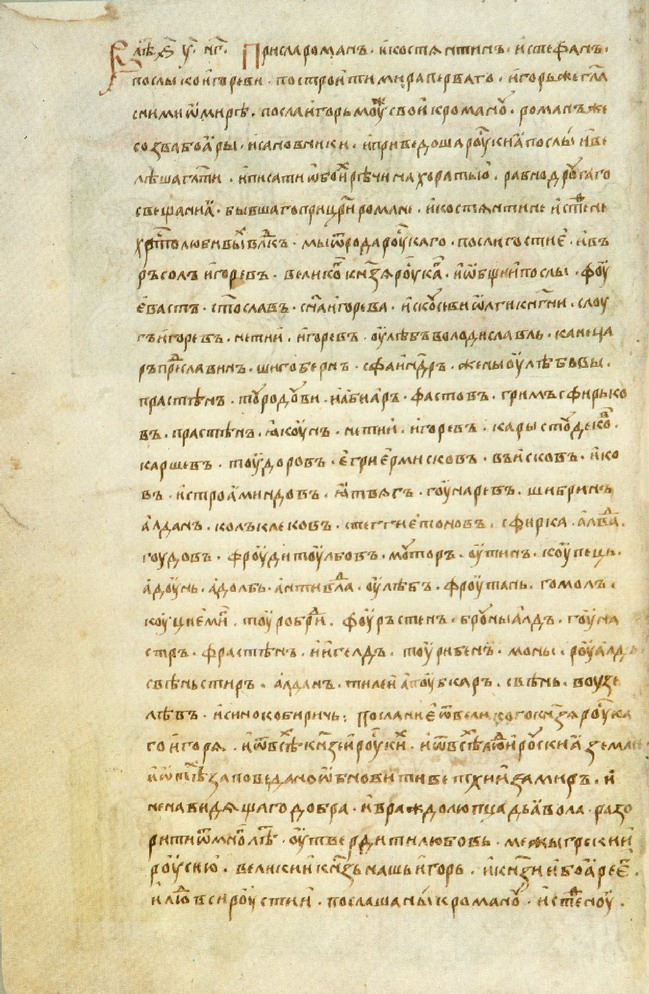
045

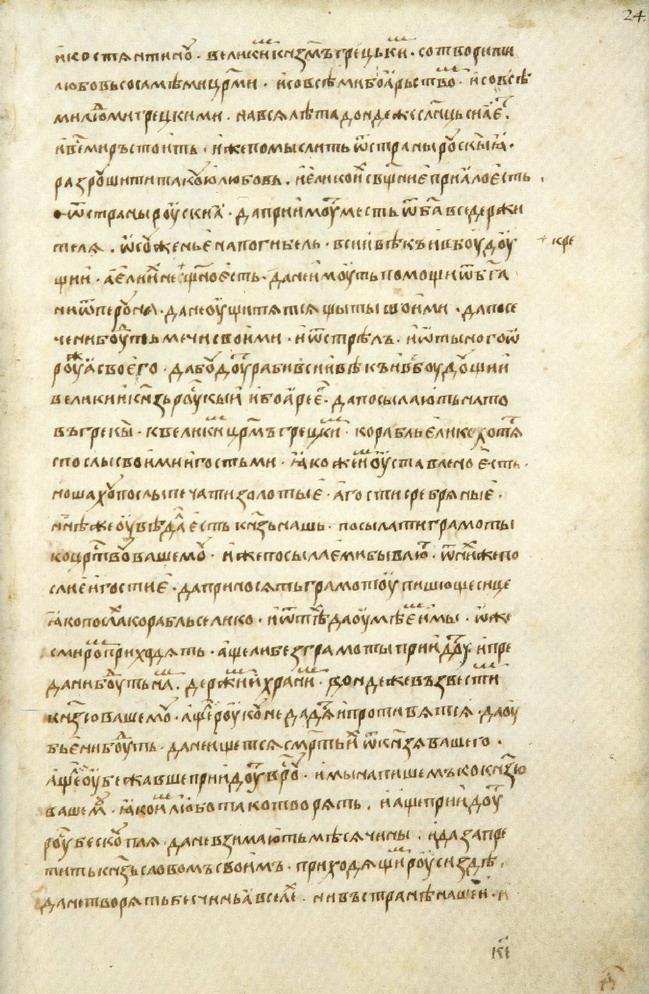
046

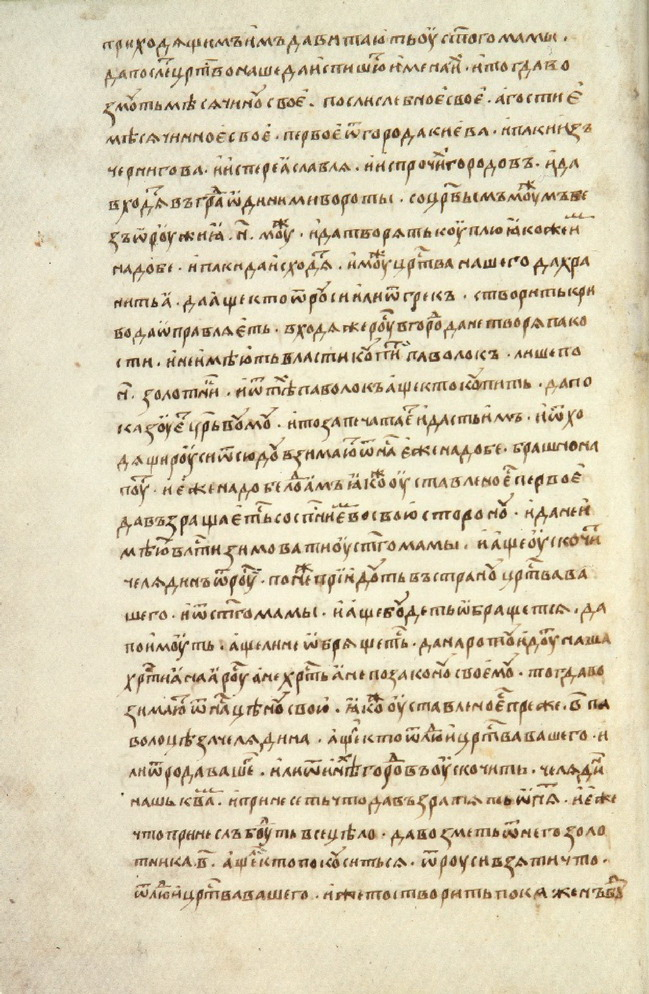
047

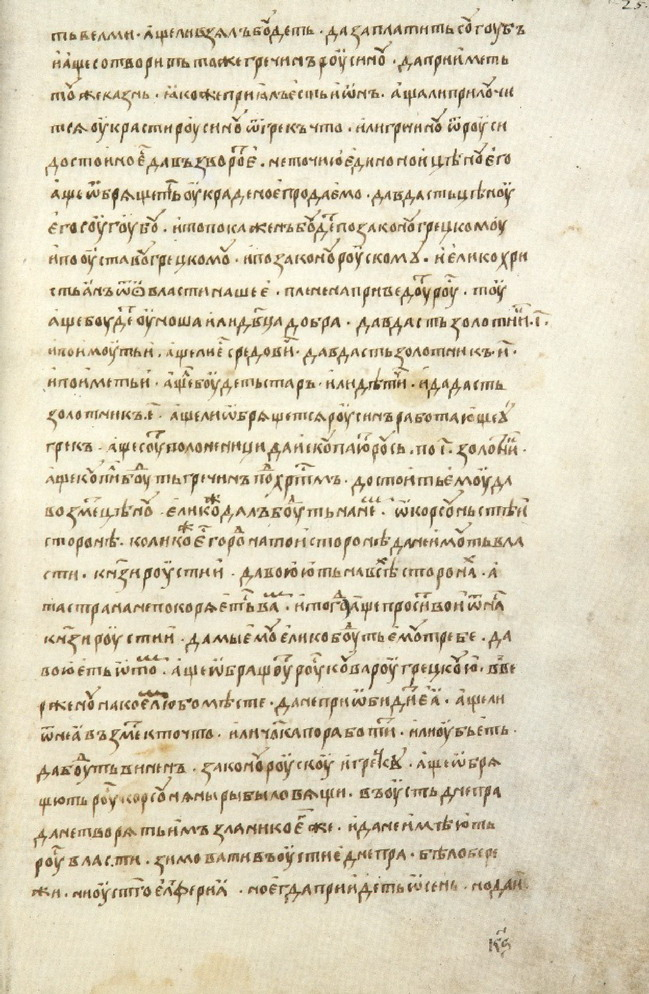
048

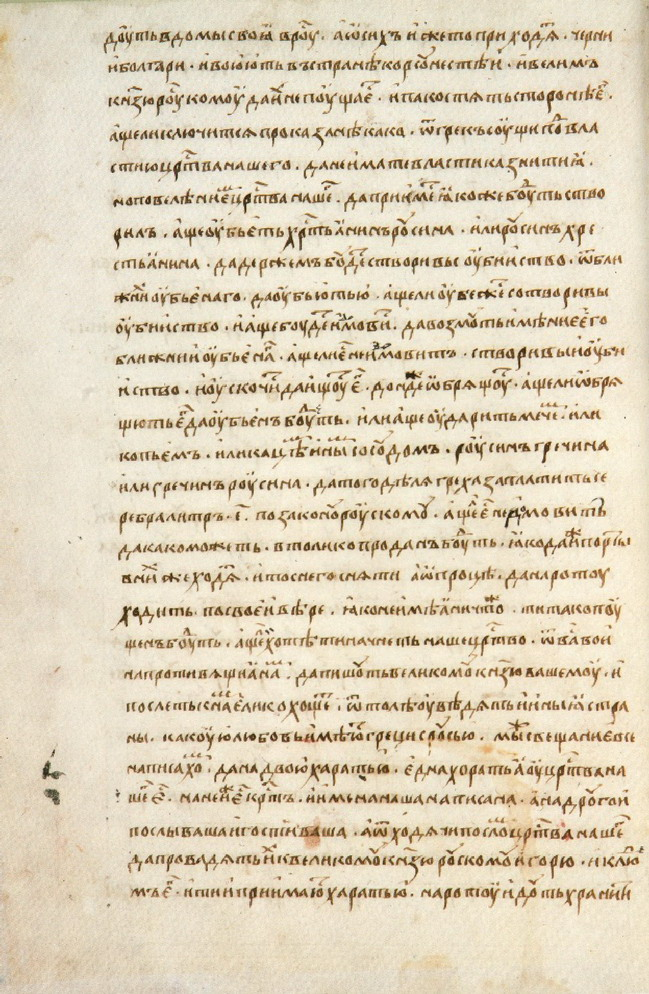
049

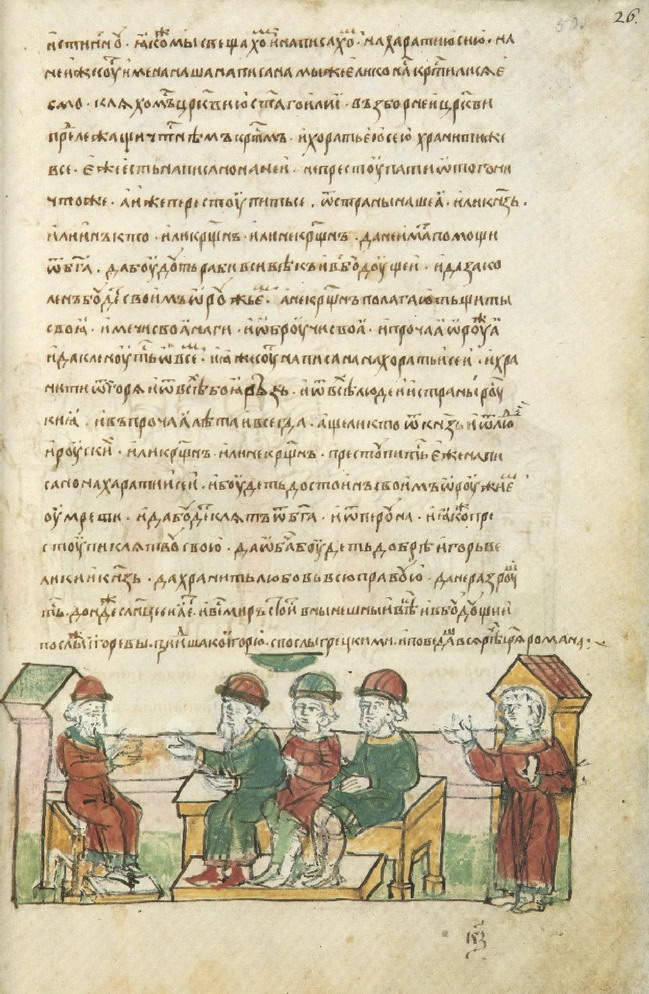
050

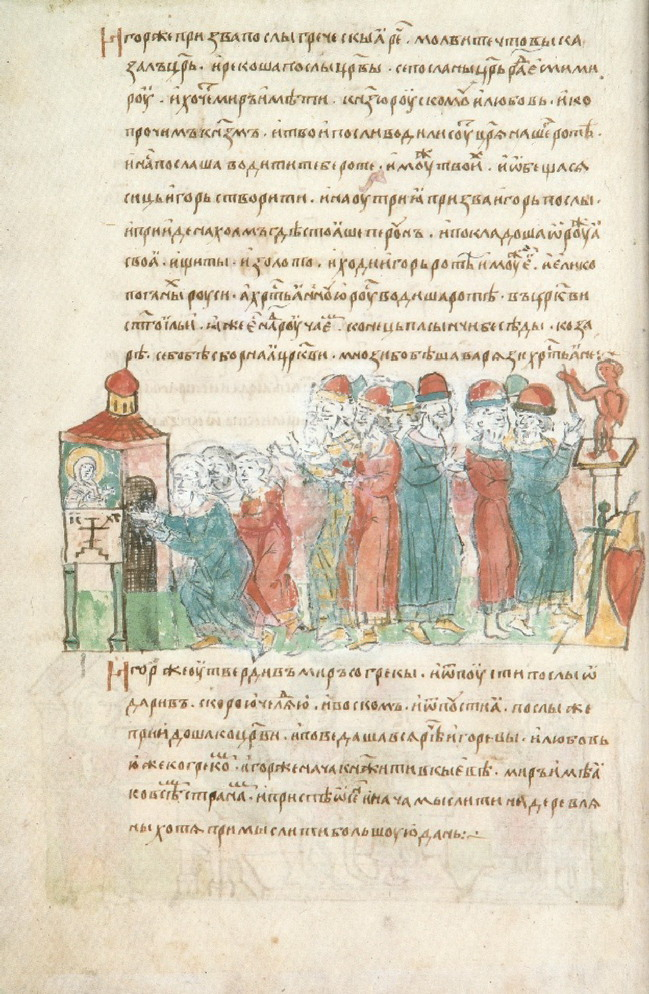
051

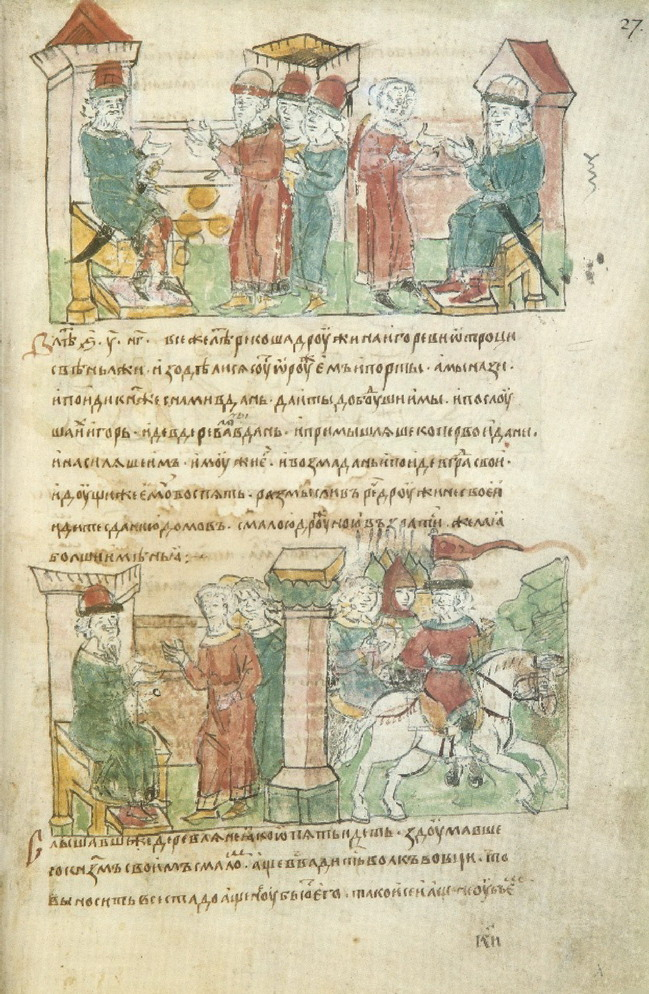
052

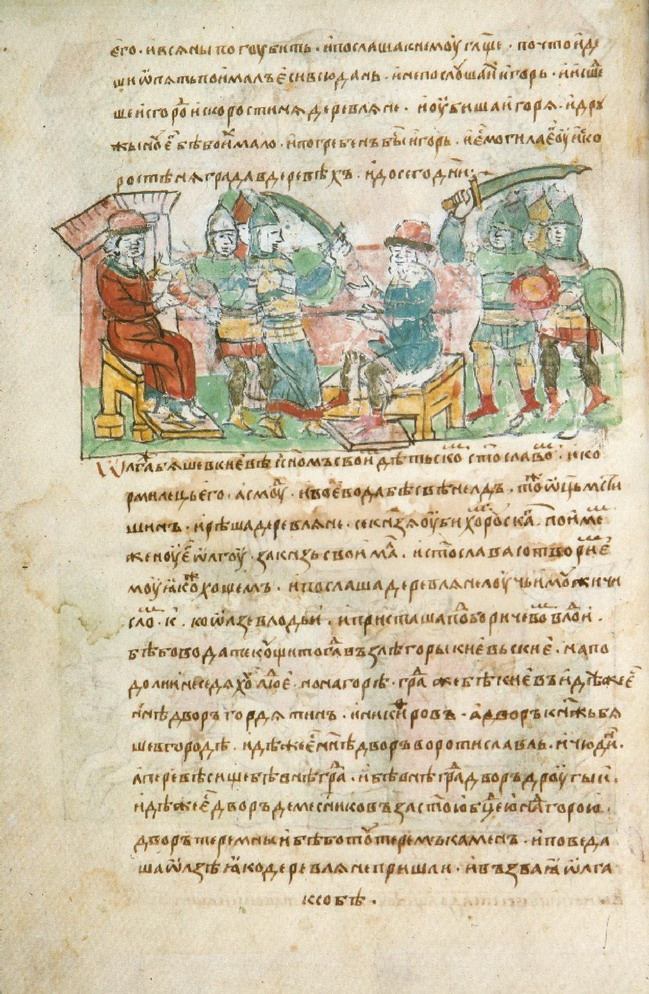
053

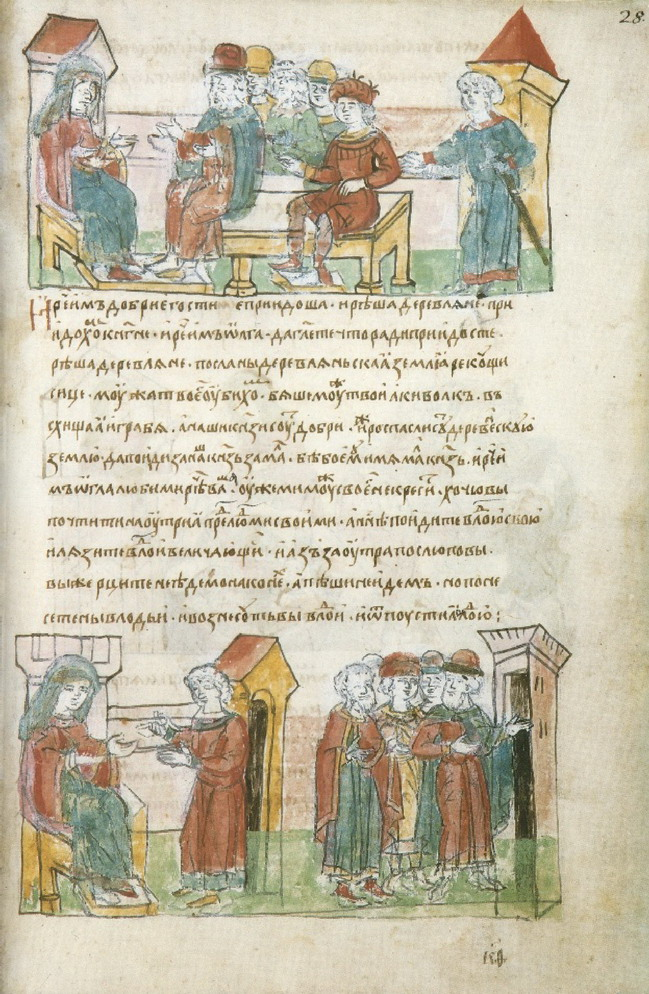
054

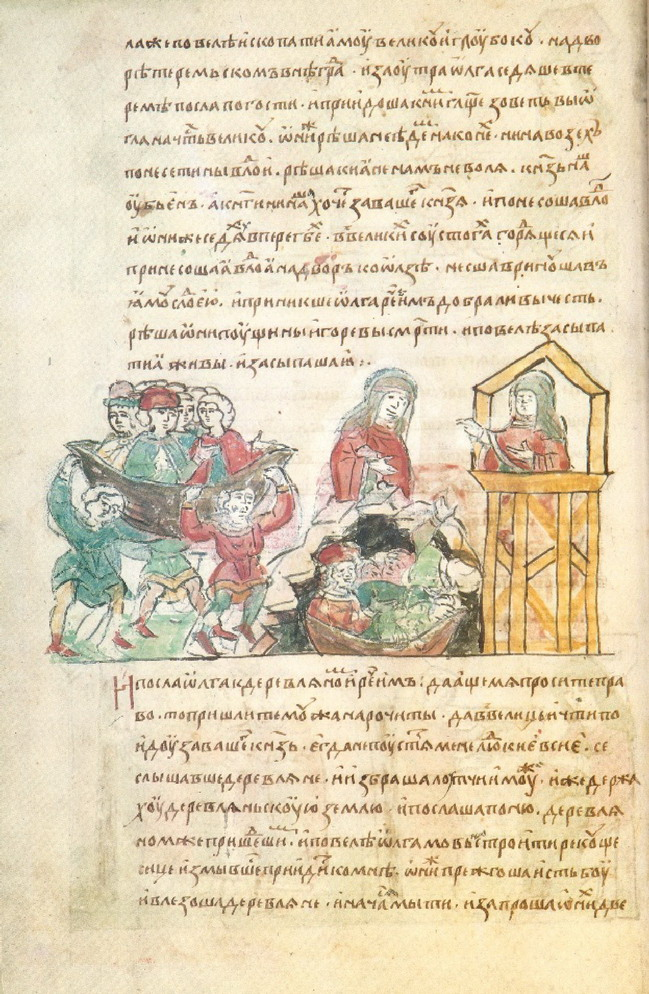
055

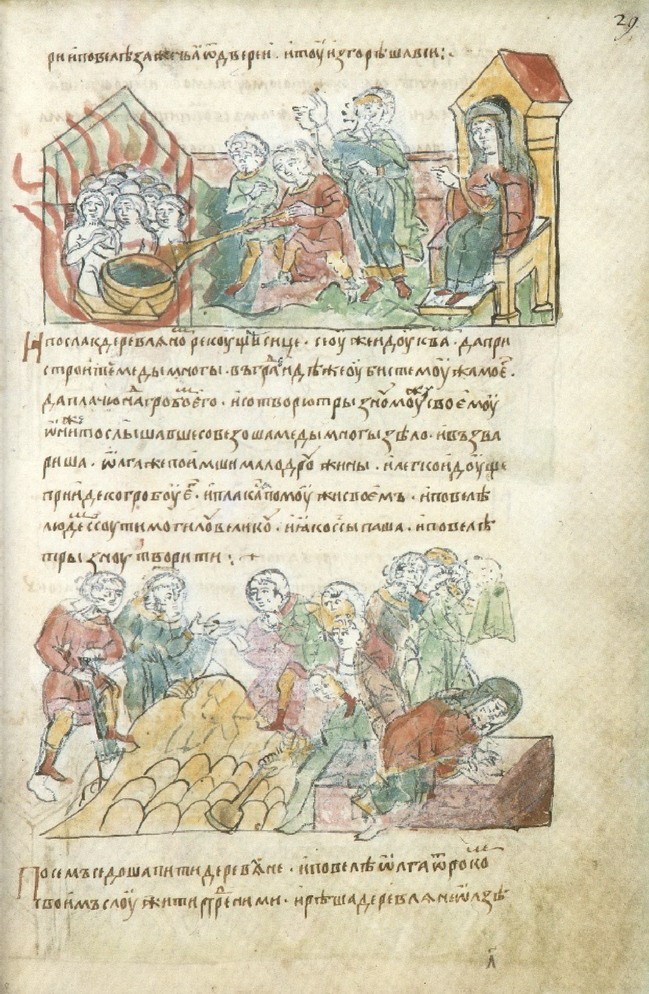
056

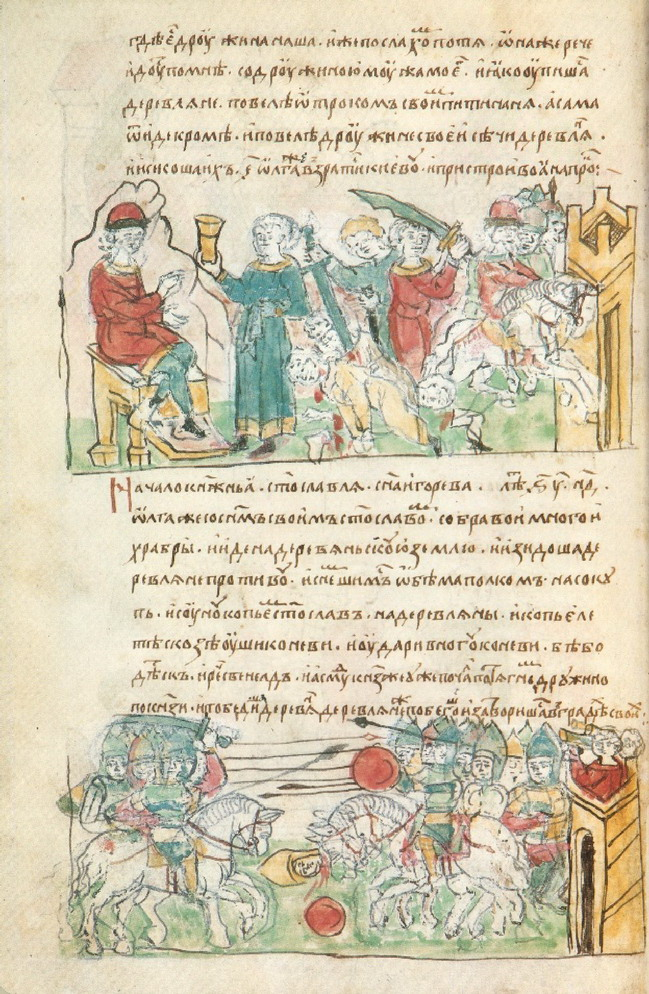
057

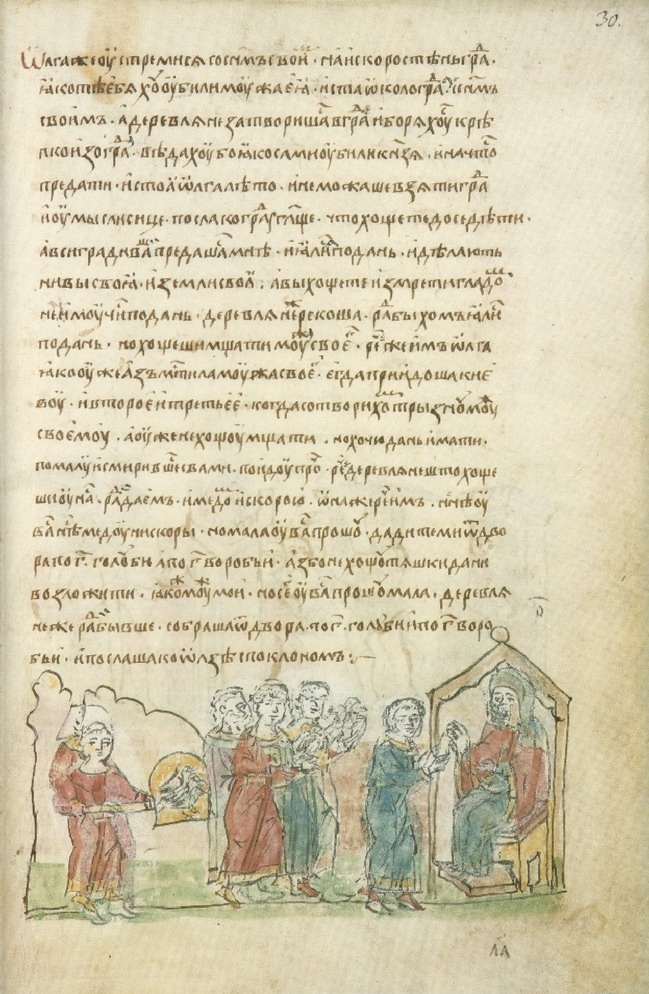
058

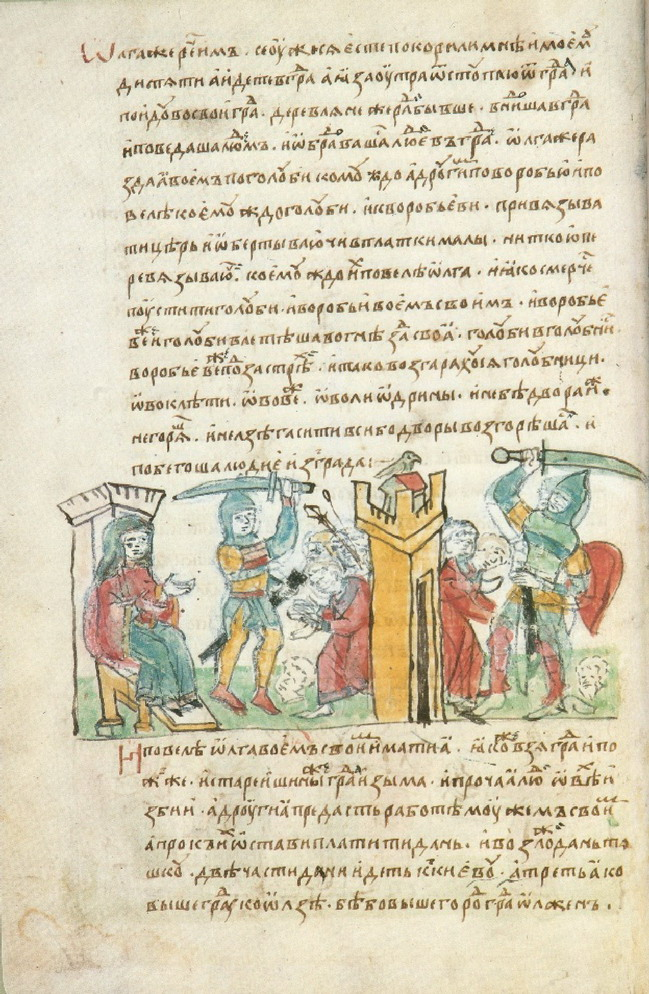
059

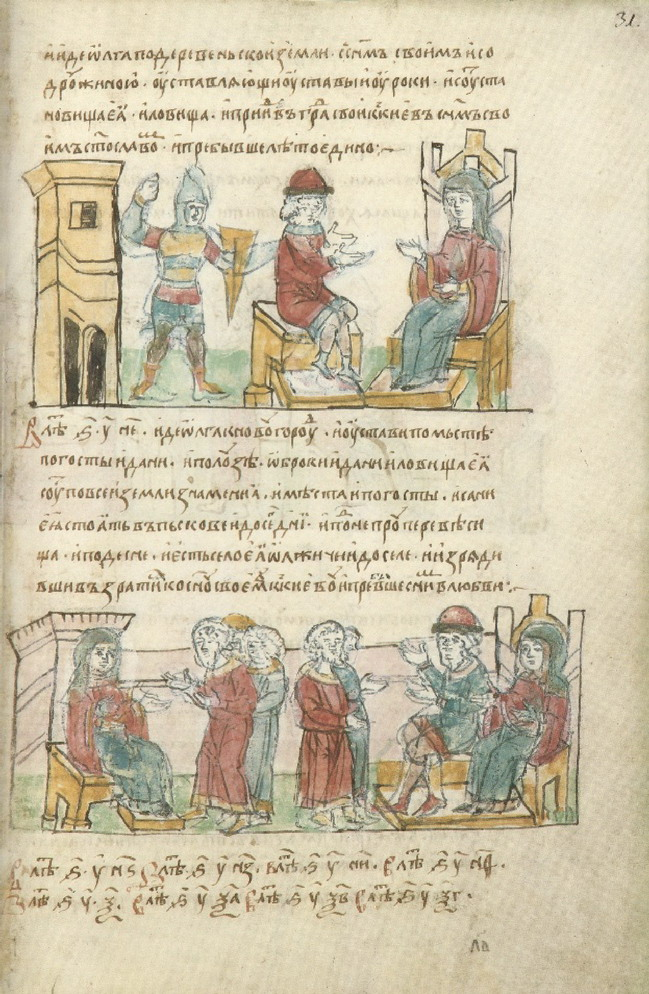
060

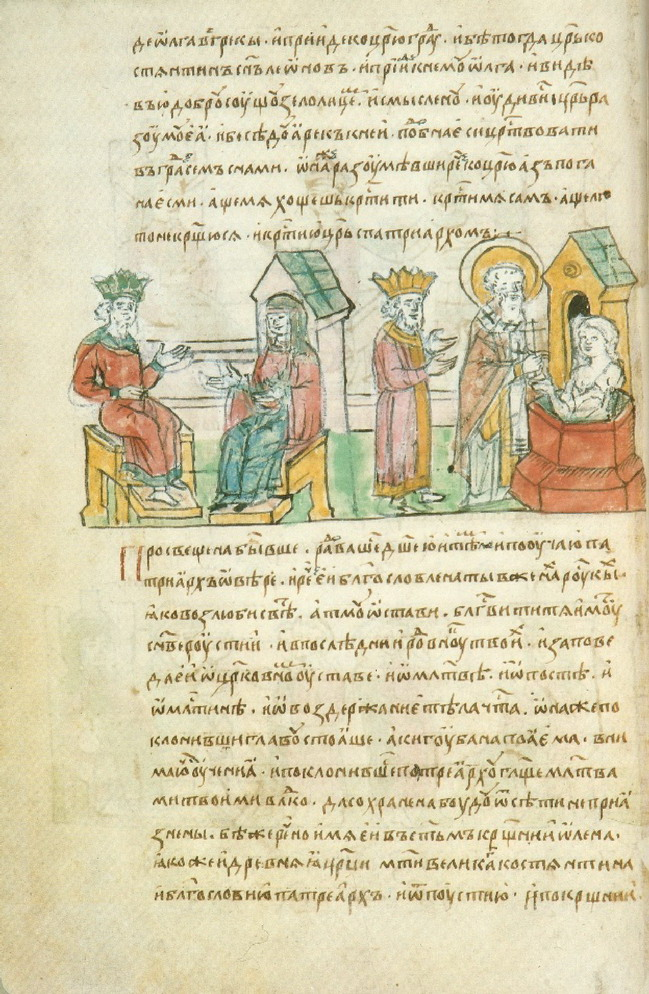
061

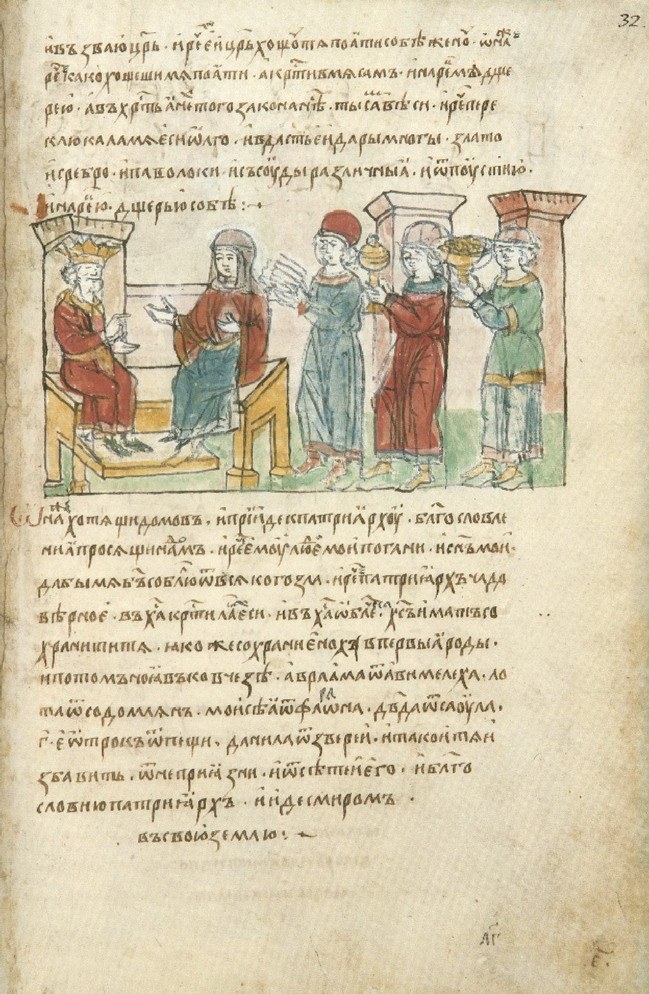
062

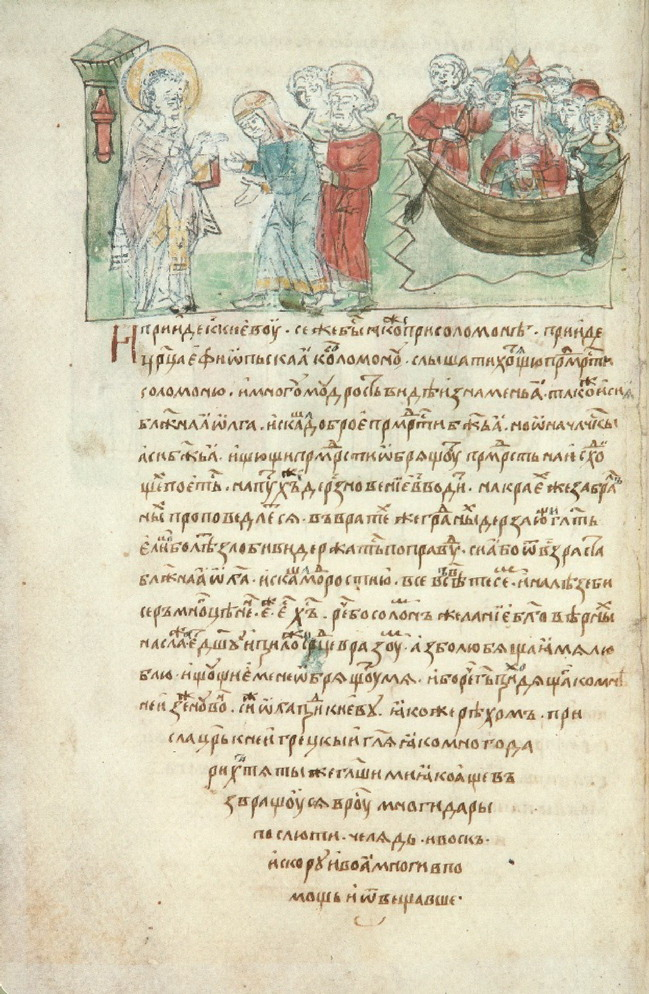
063

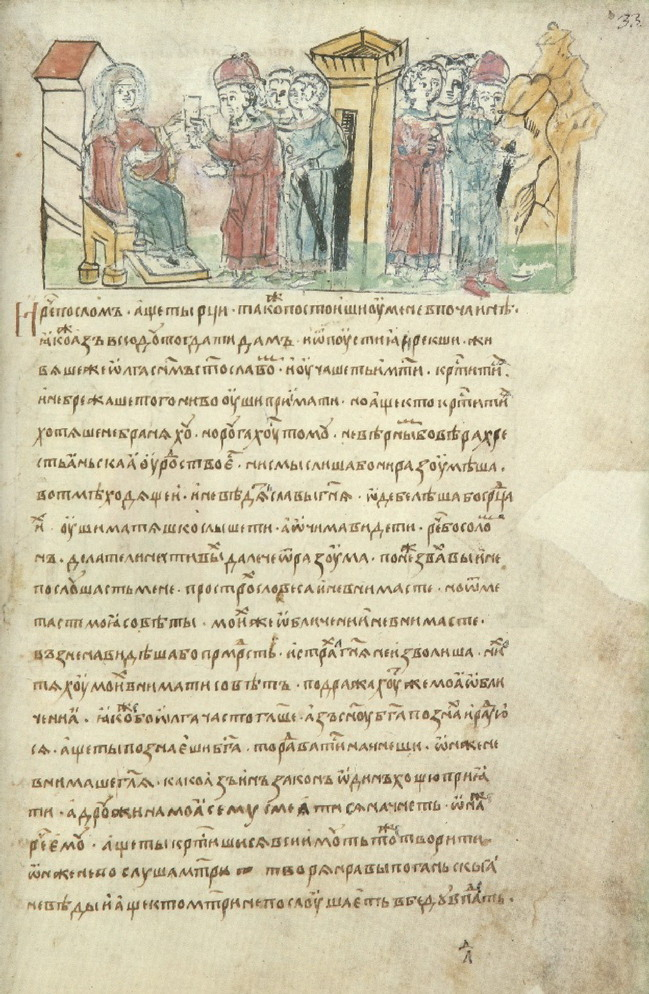
064

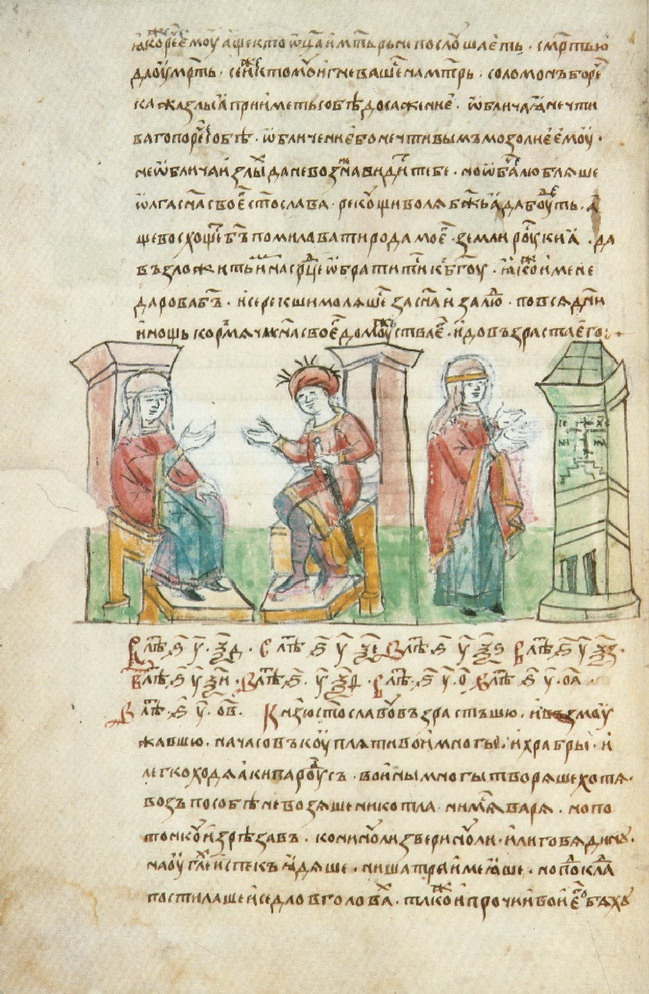
065

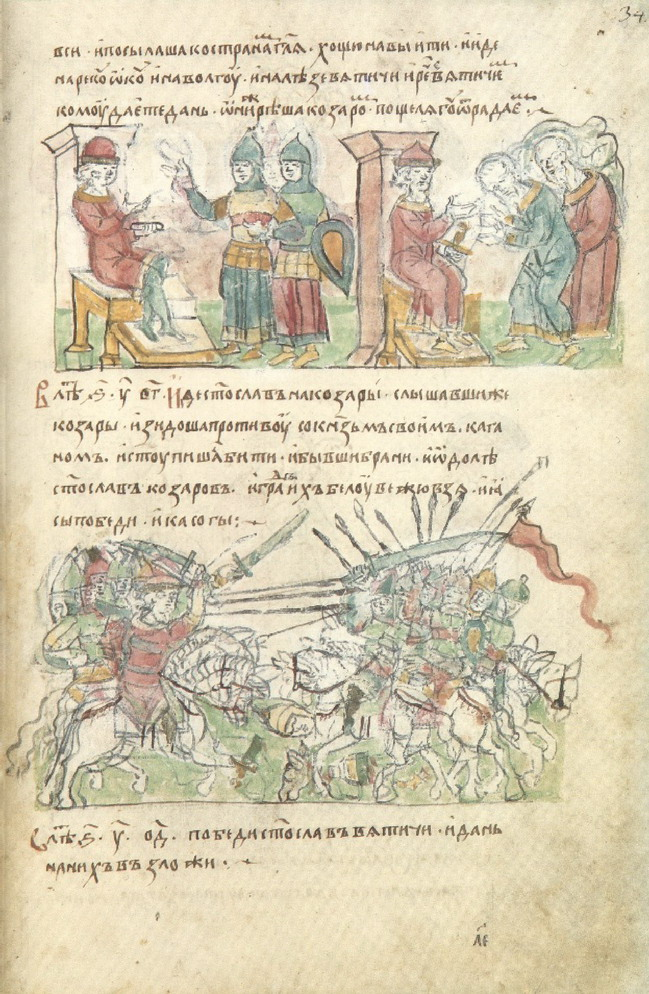
066

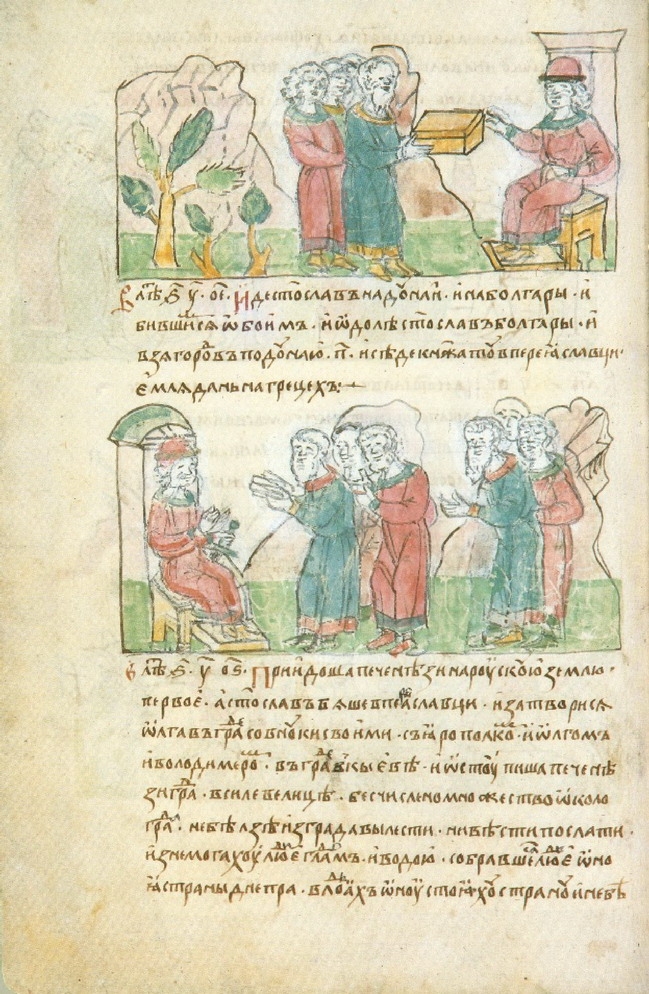
067

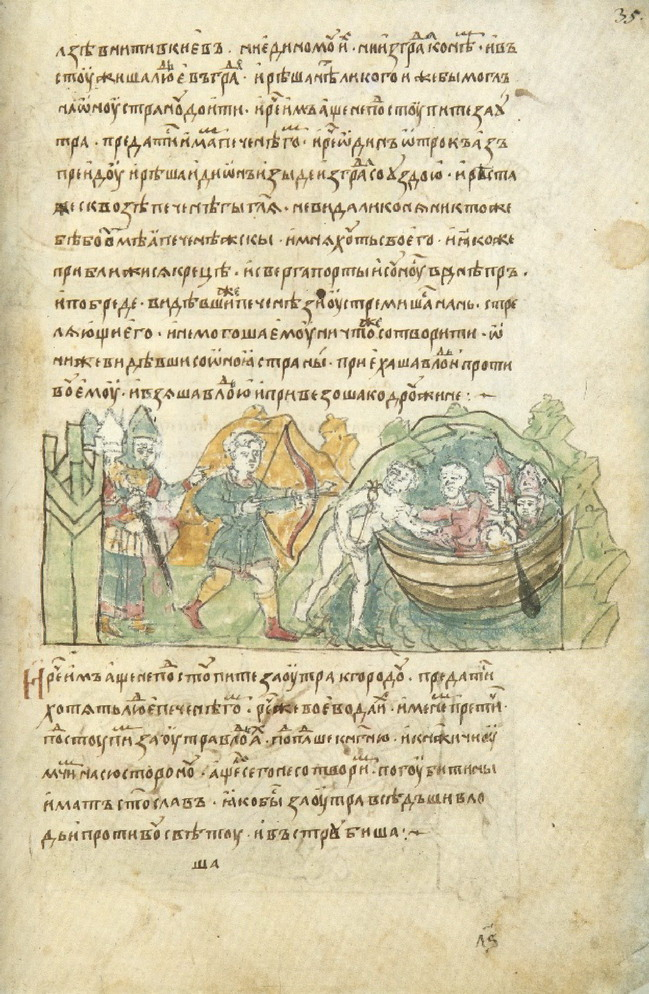
068

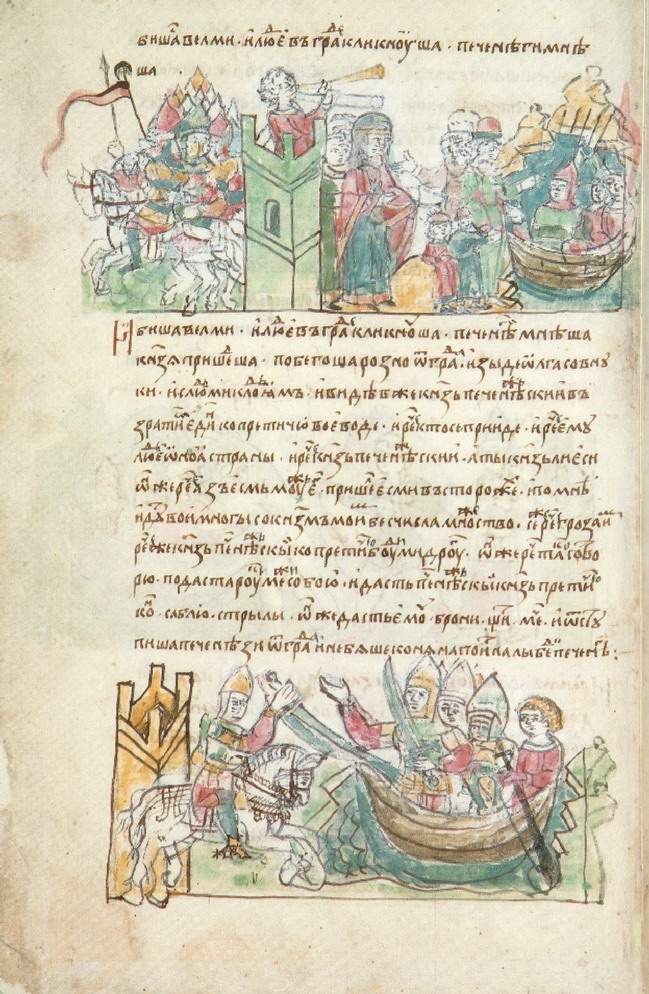
069

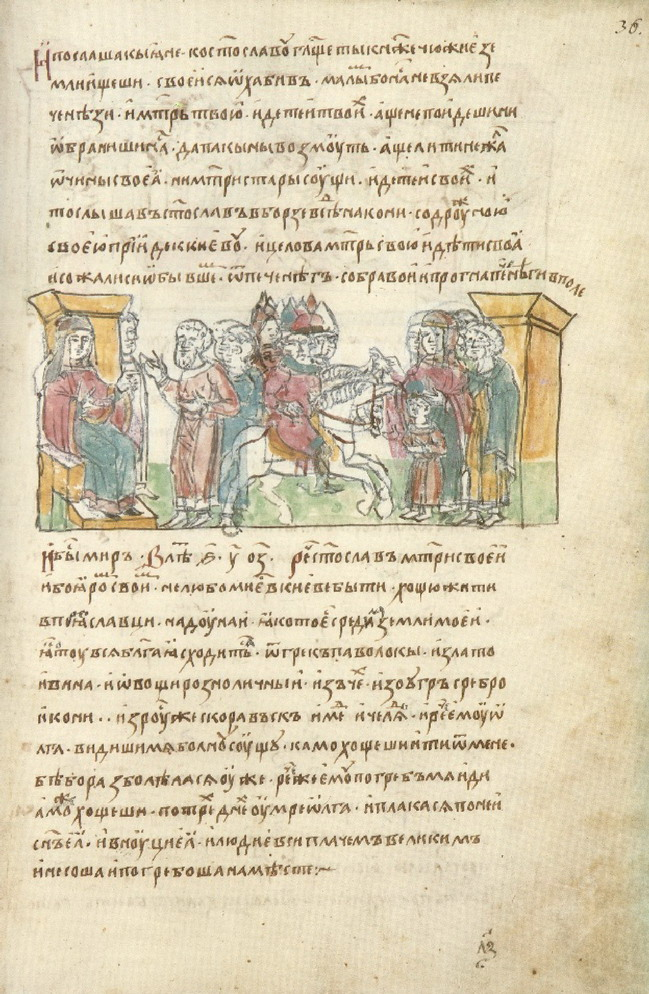
070

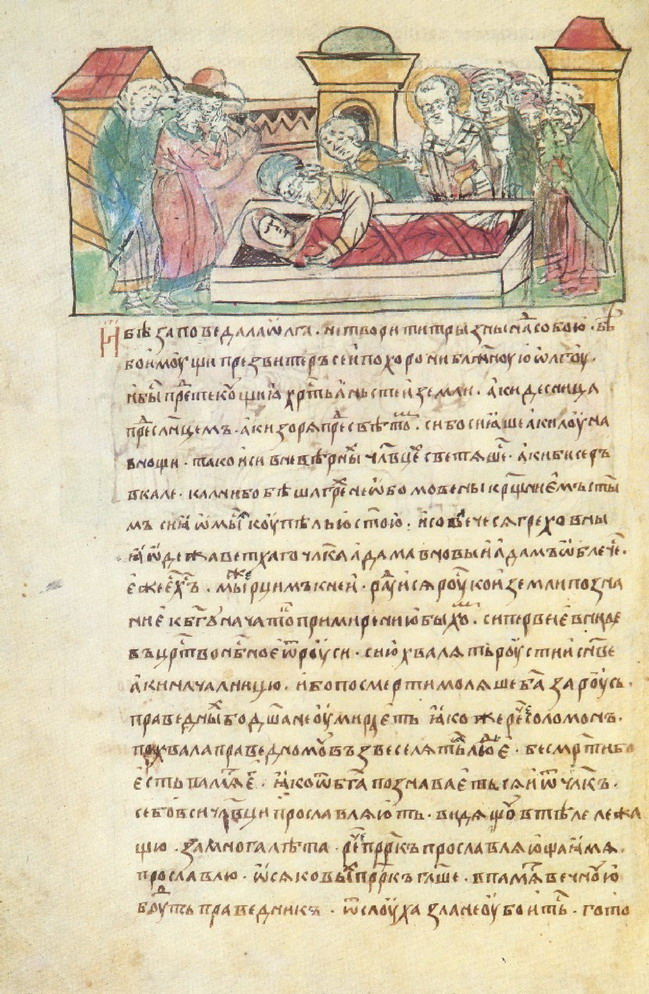
071

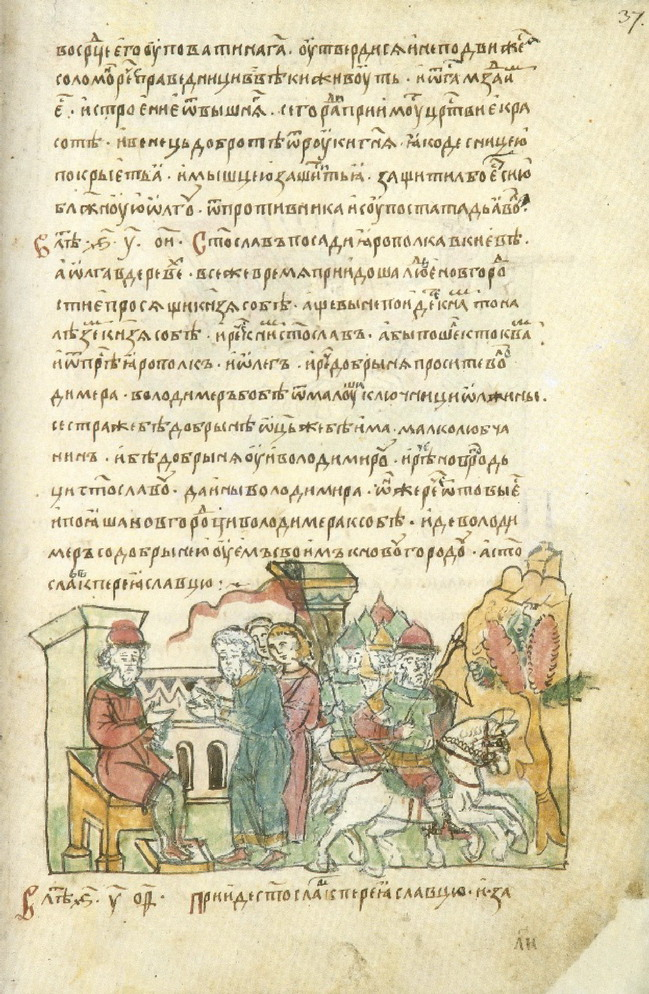
072

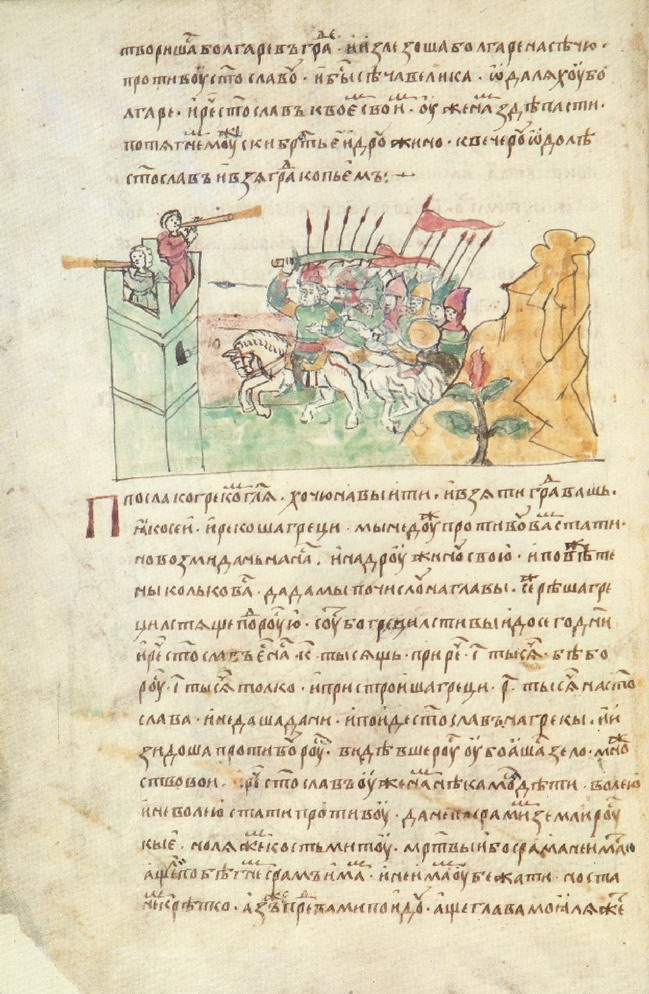
073

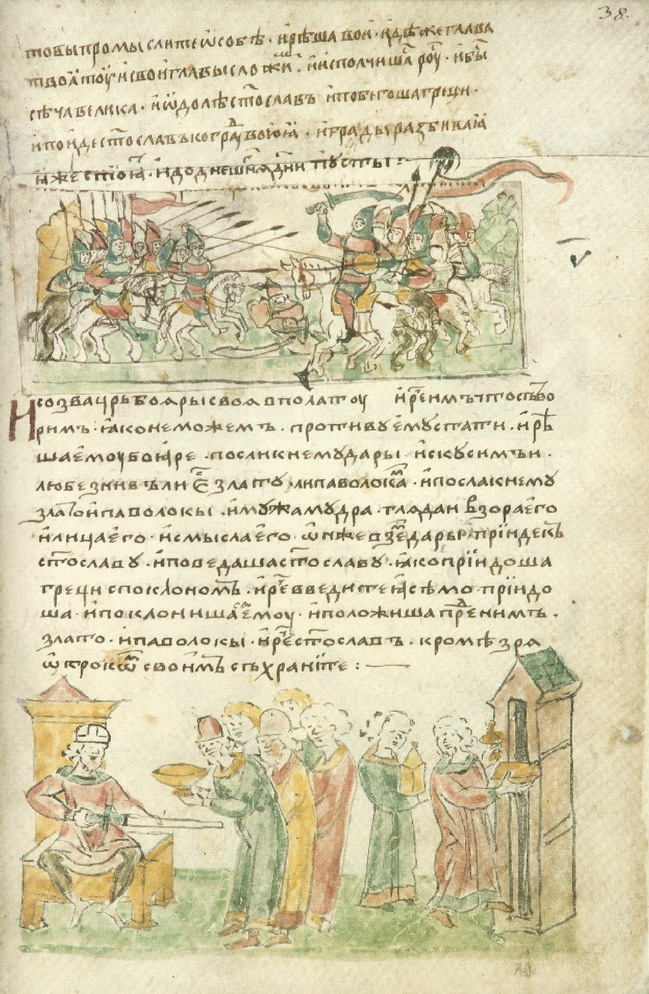
074

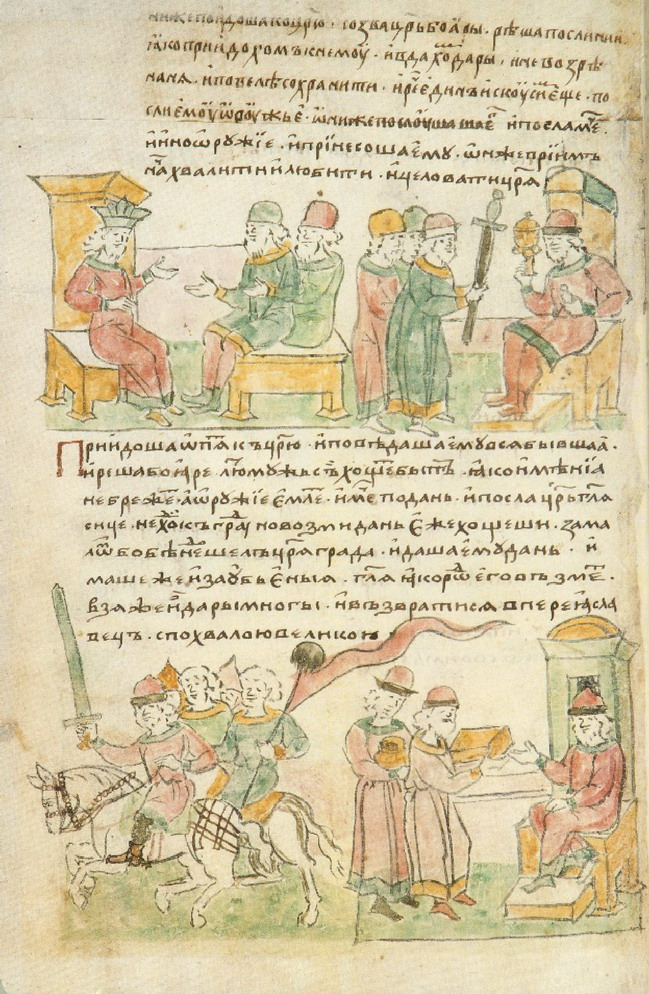
075

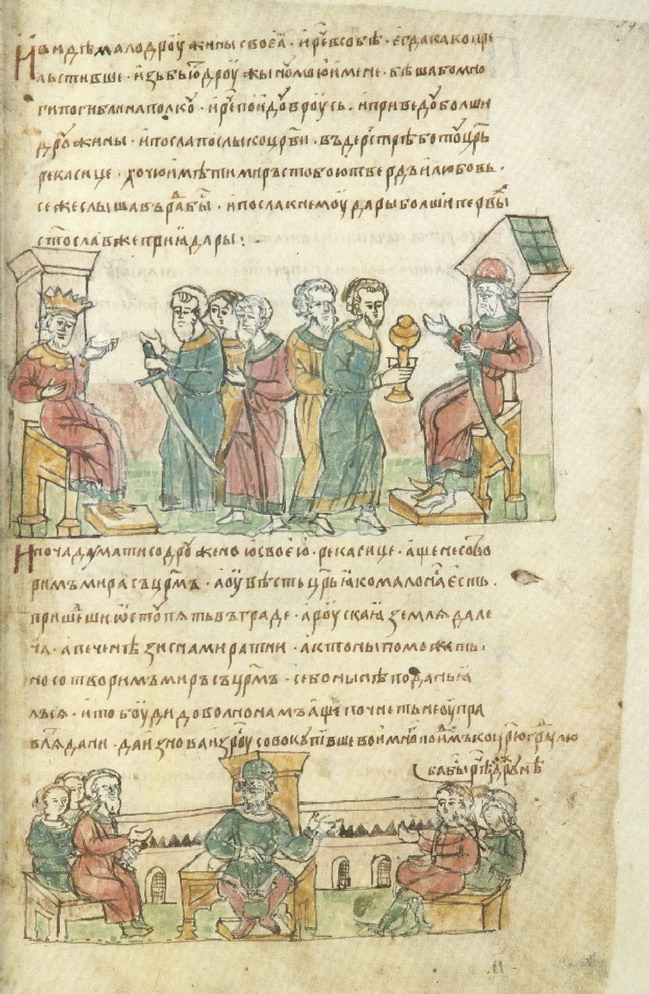
076

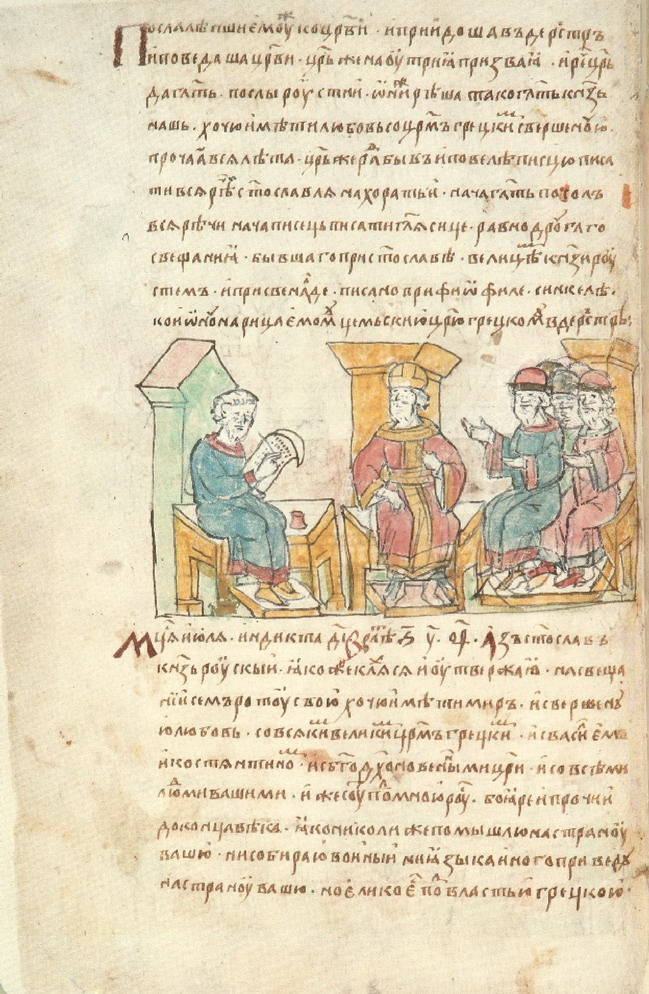
077

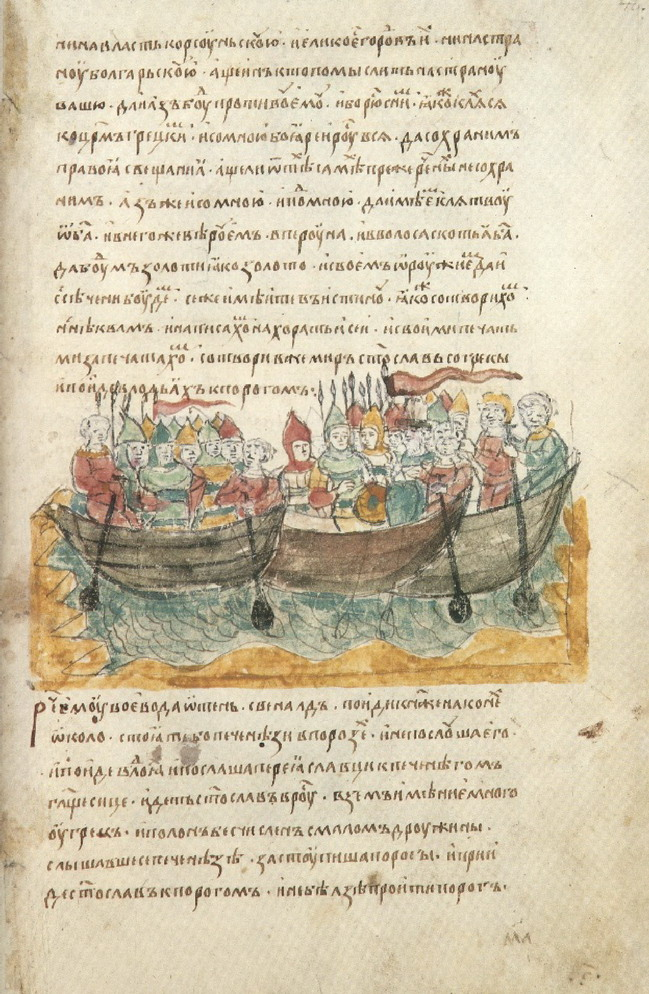
078

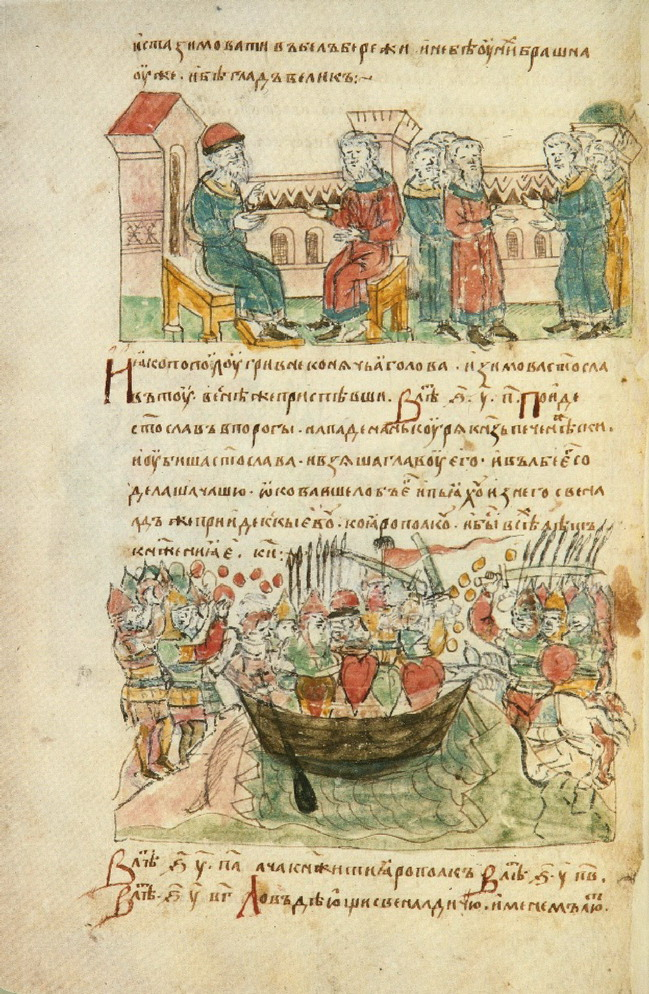
079

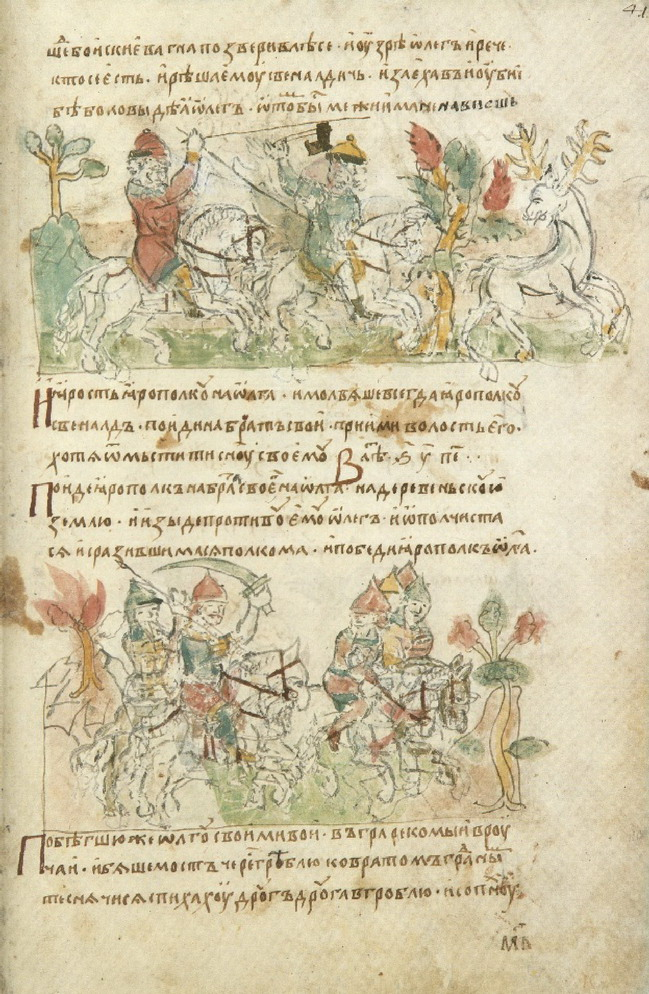
080

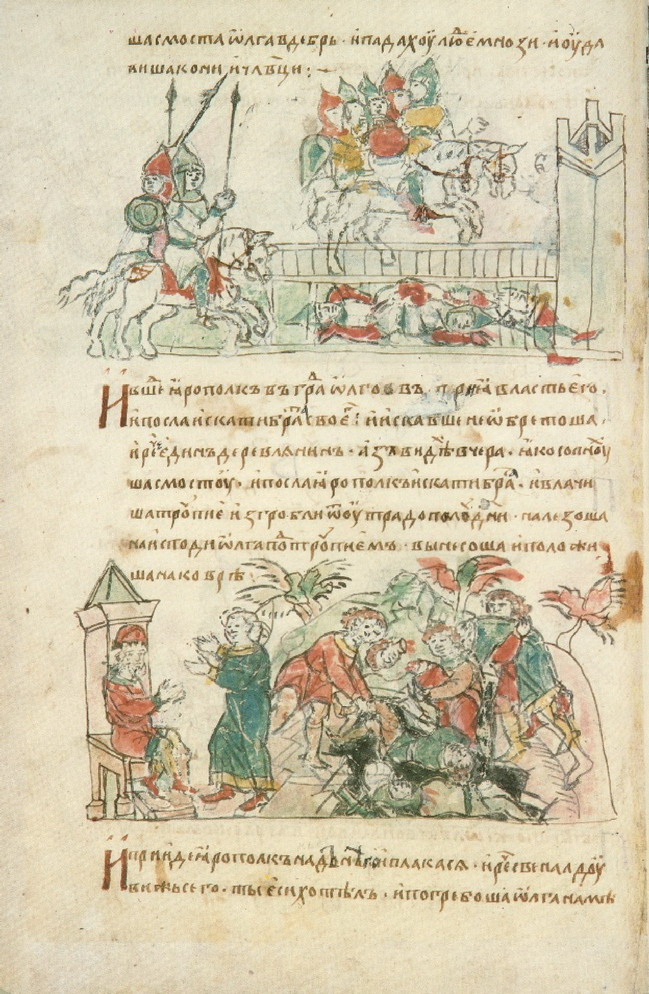
081

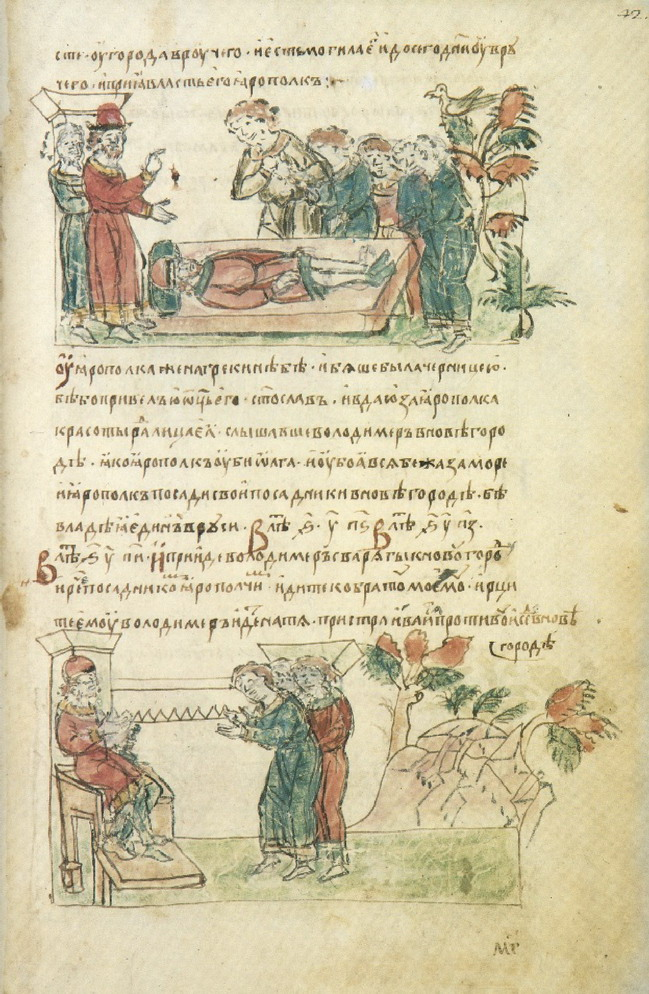
082

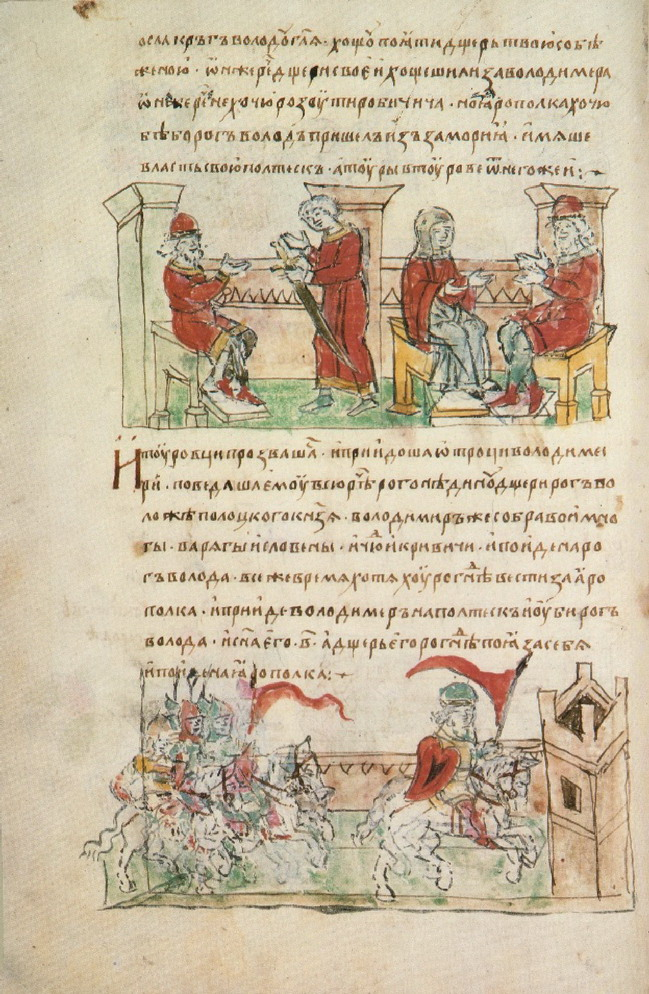
083

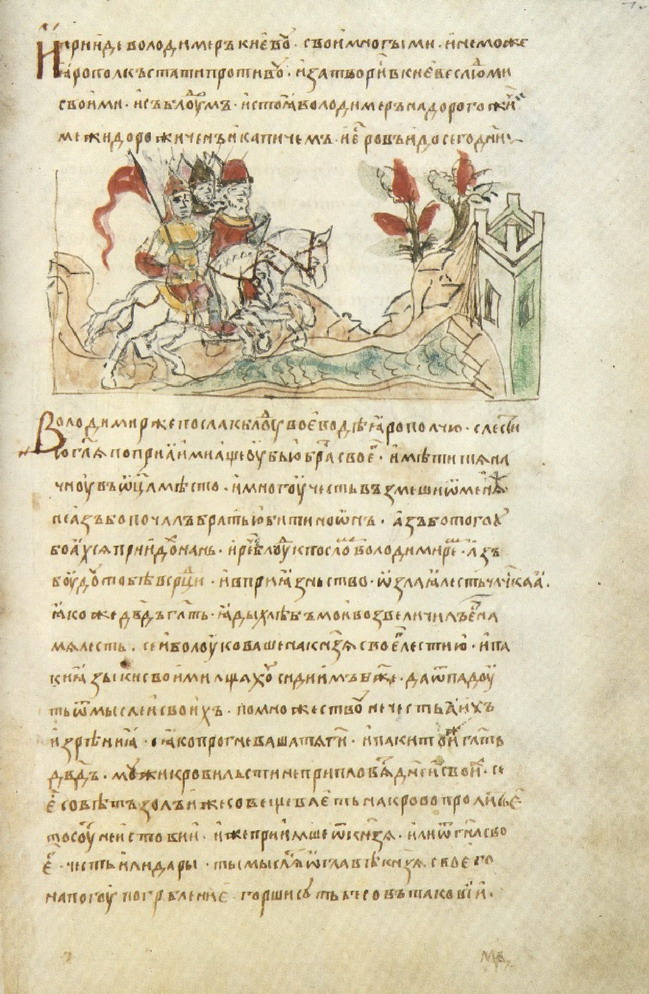
084

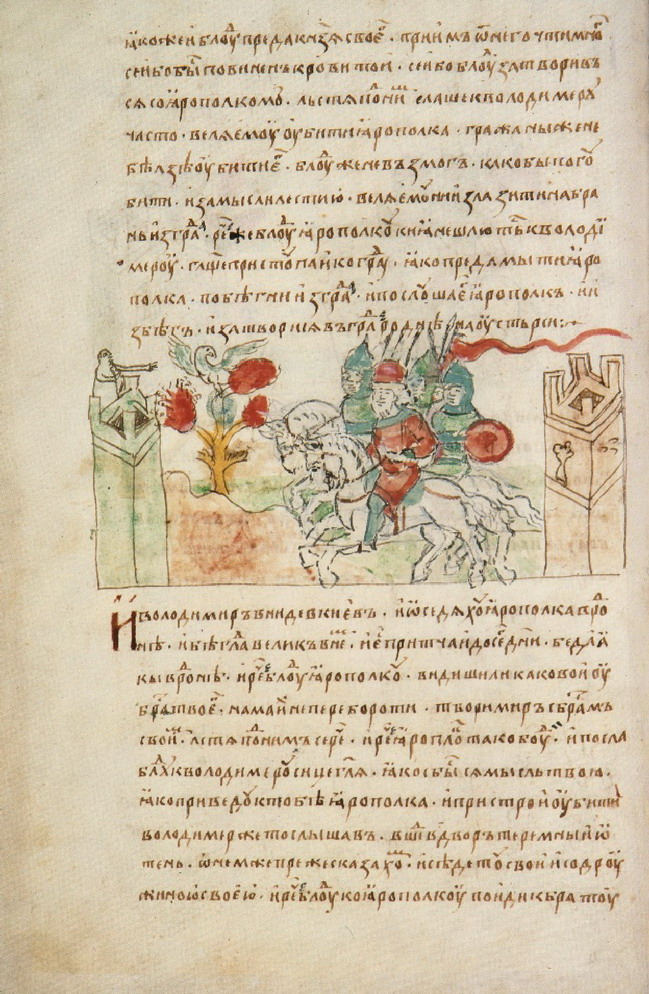
085

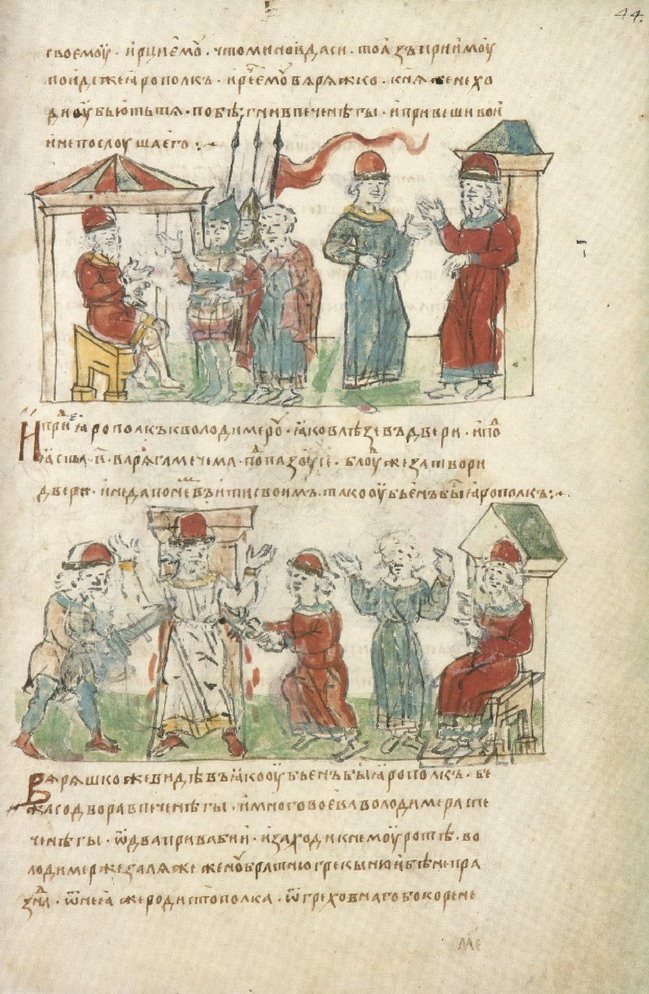
086

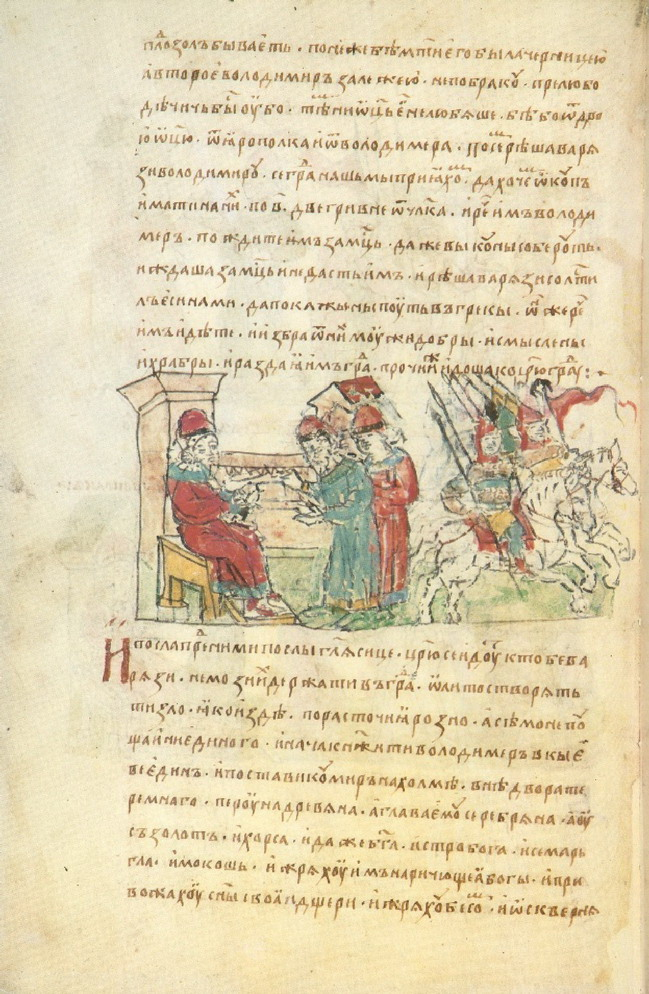
087

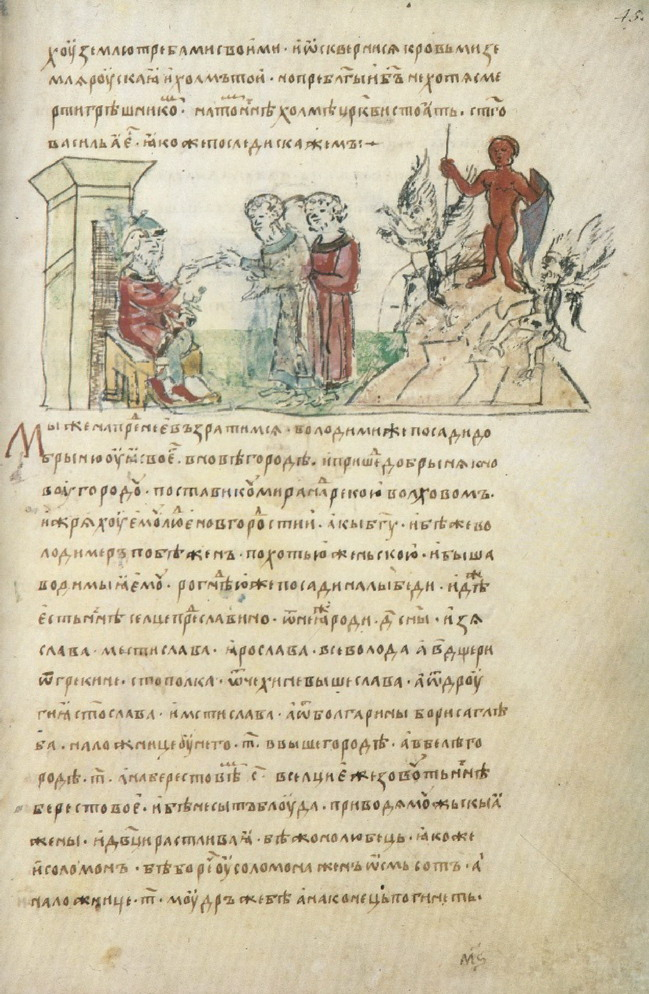
088

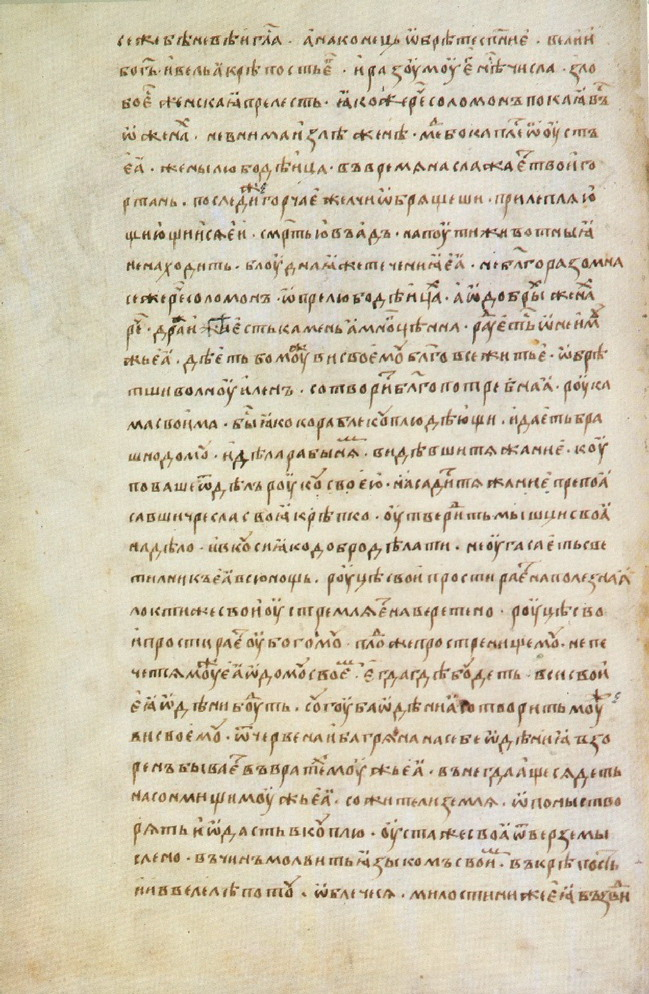
089

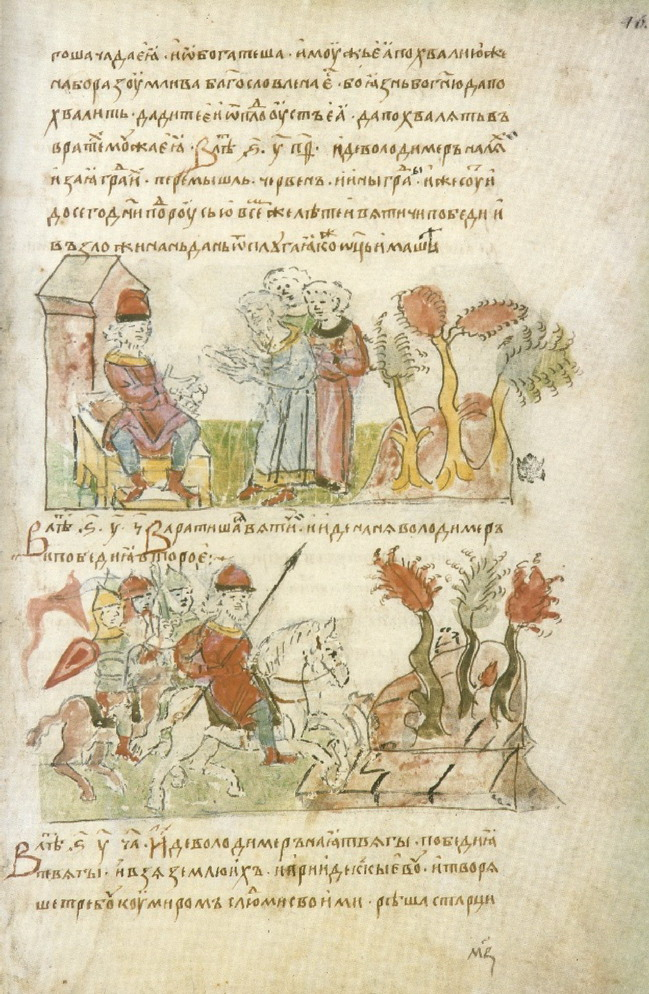
090

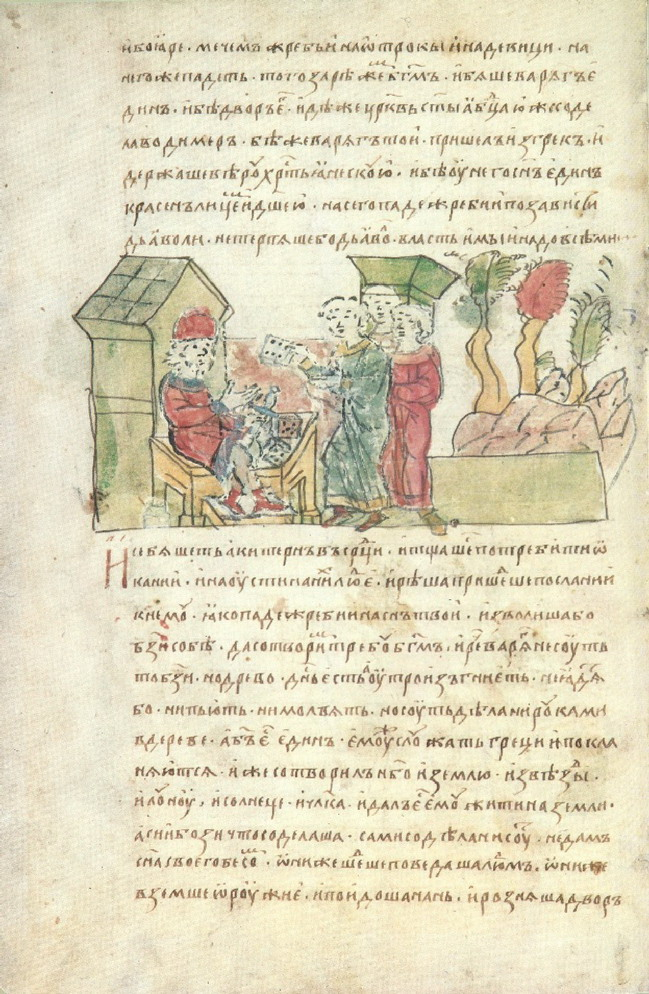
091

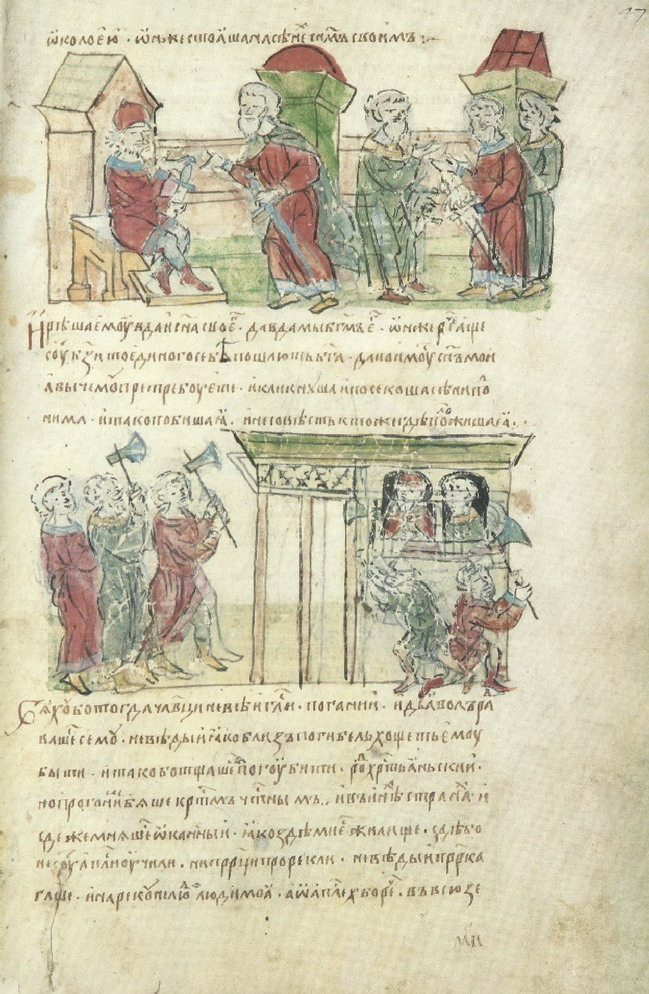
092

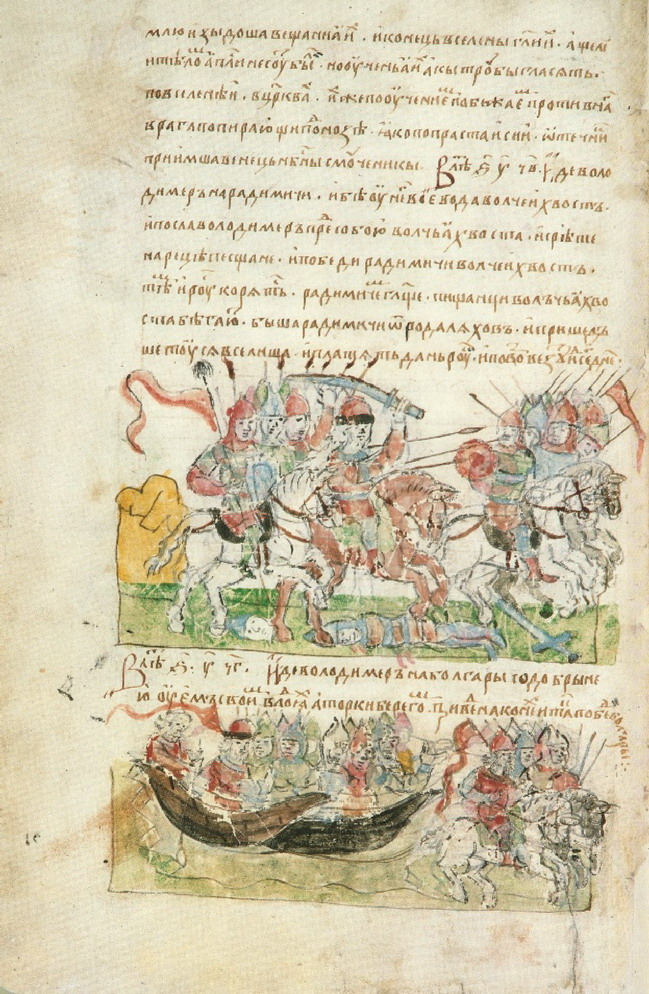
093

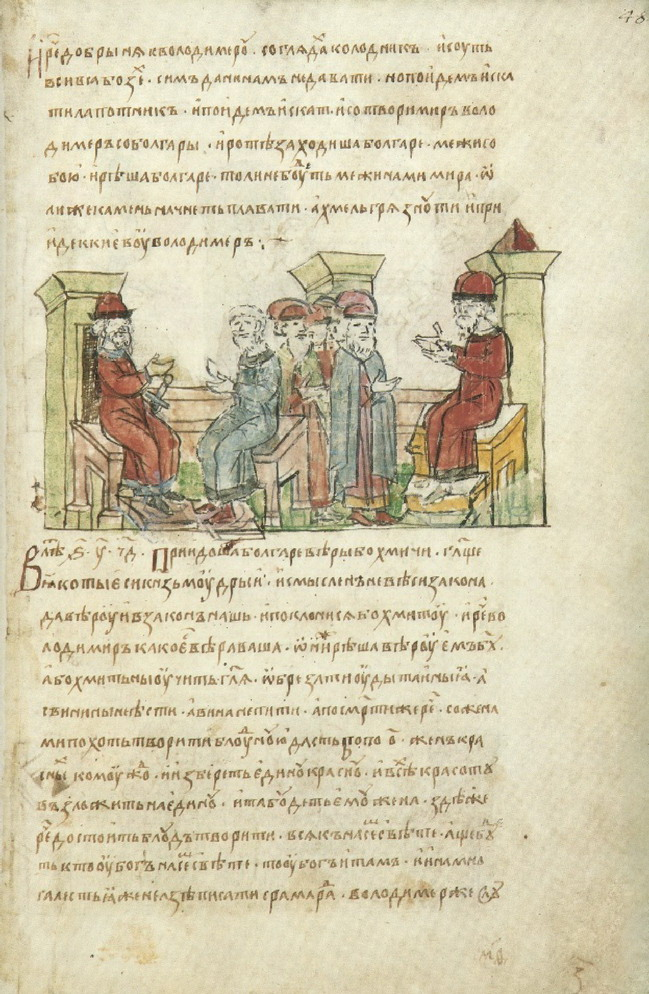
094

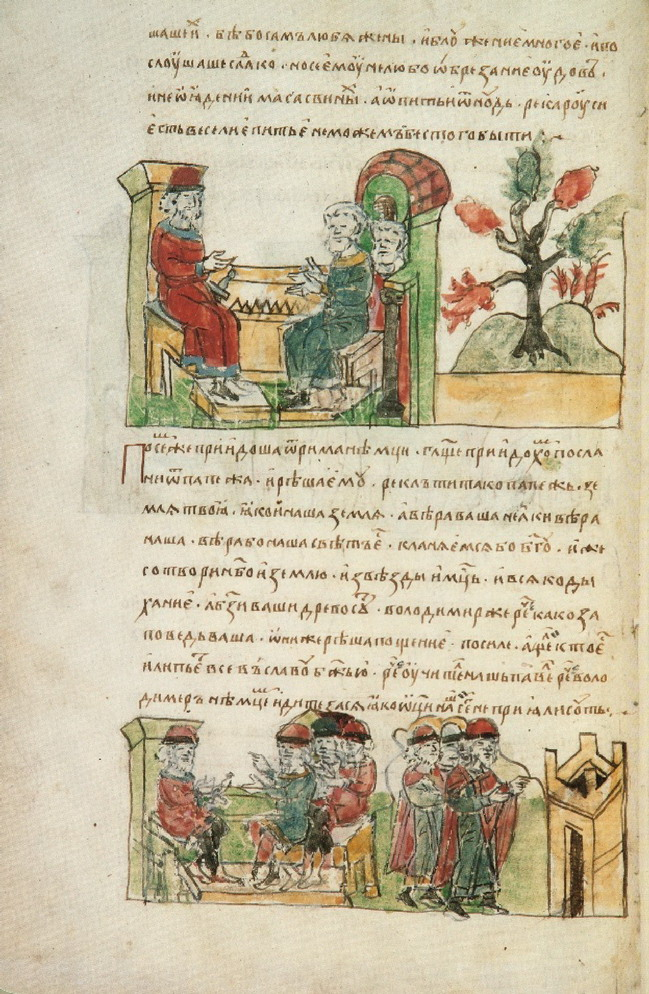
095

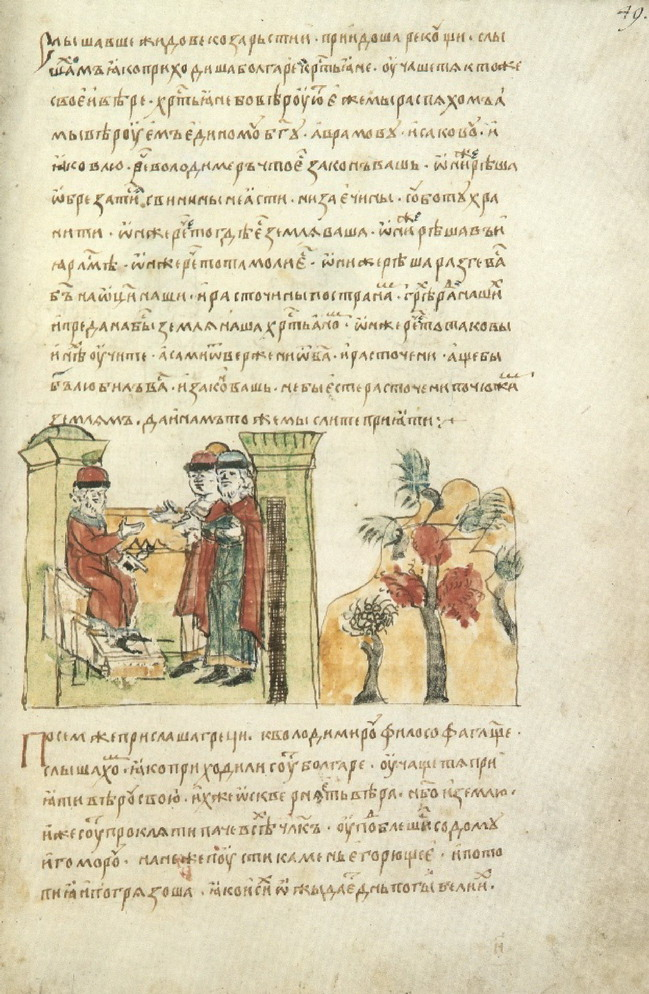
096

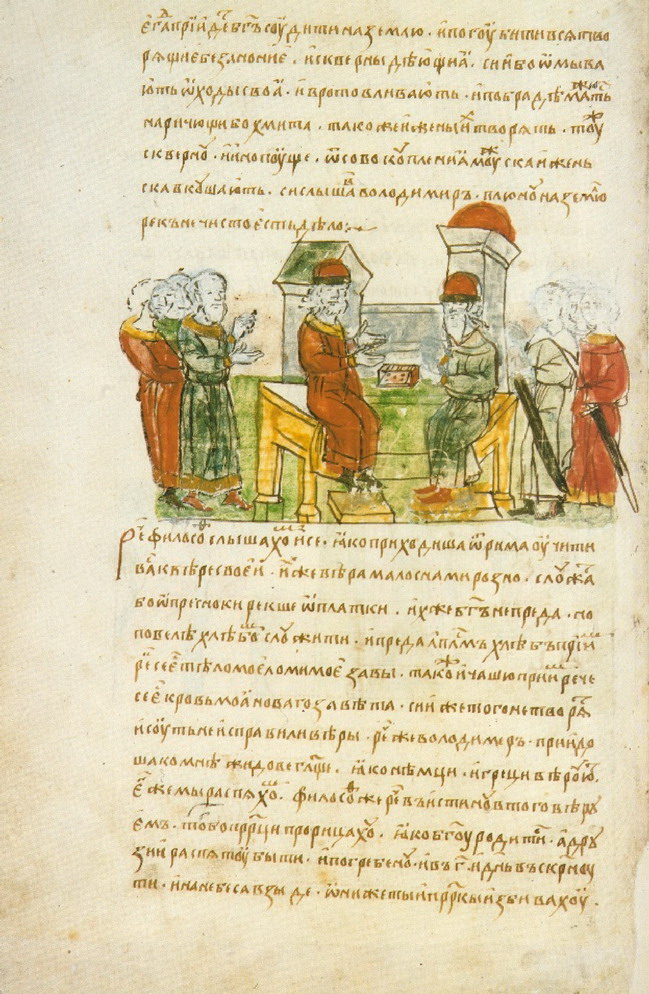
097

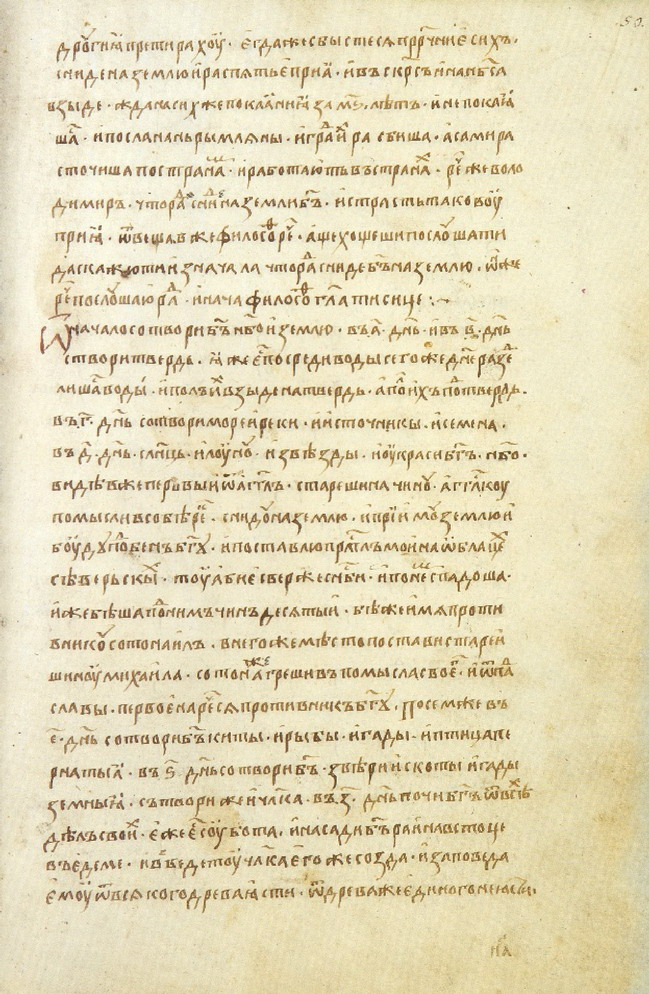
098

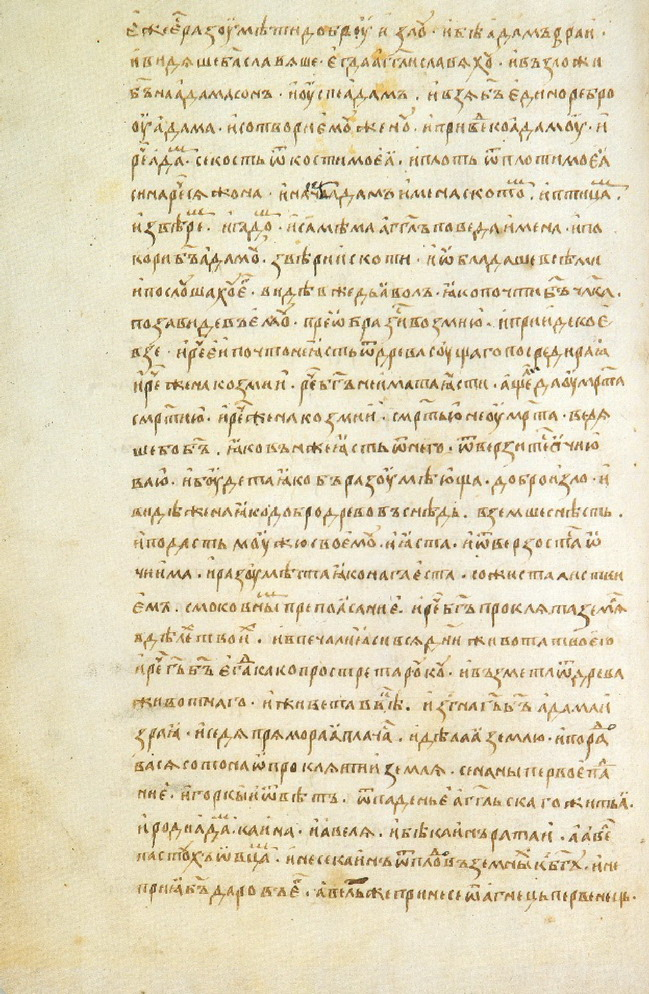
099

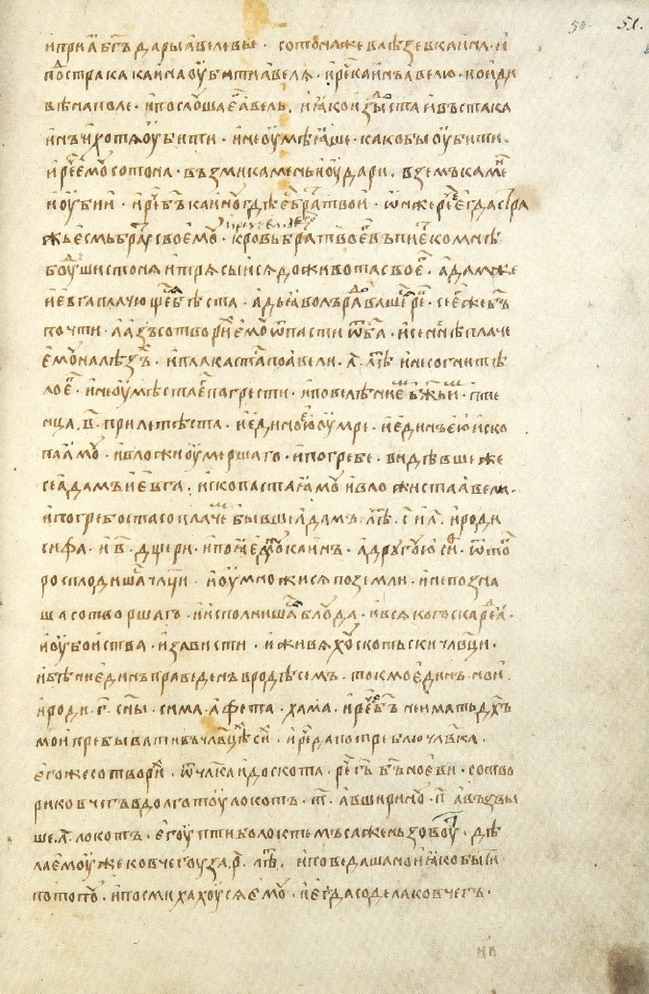
100

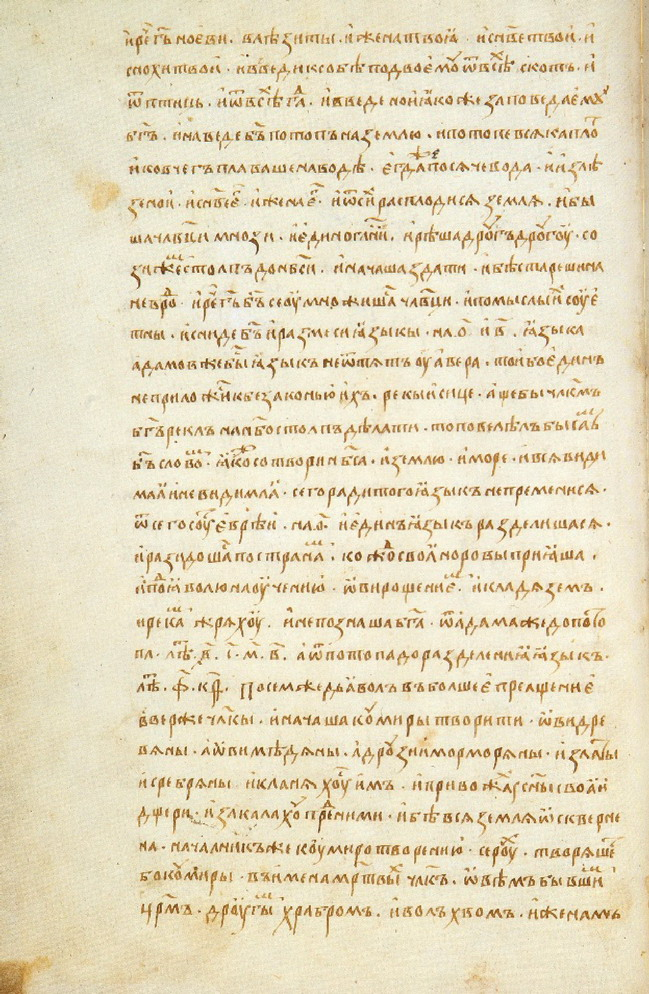
101

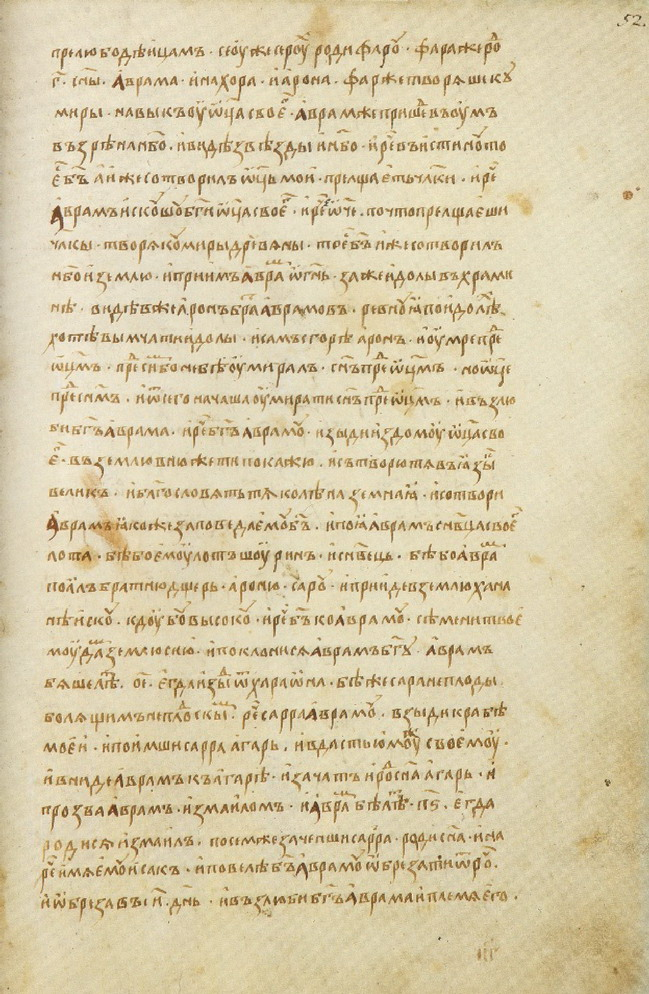
102

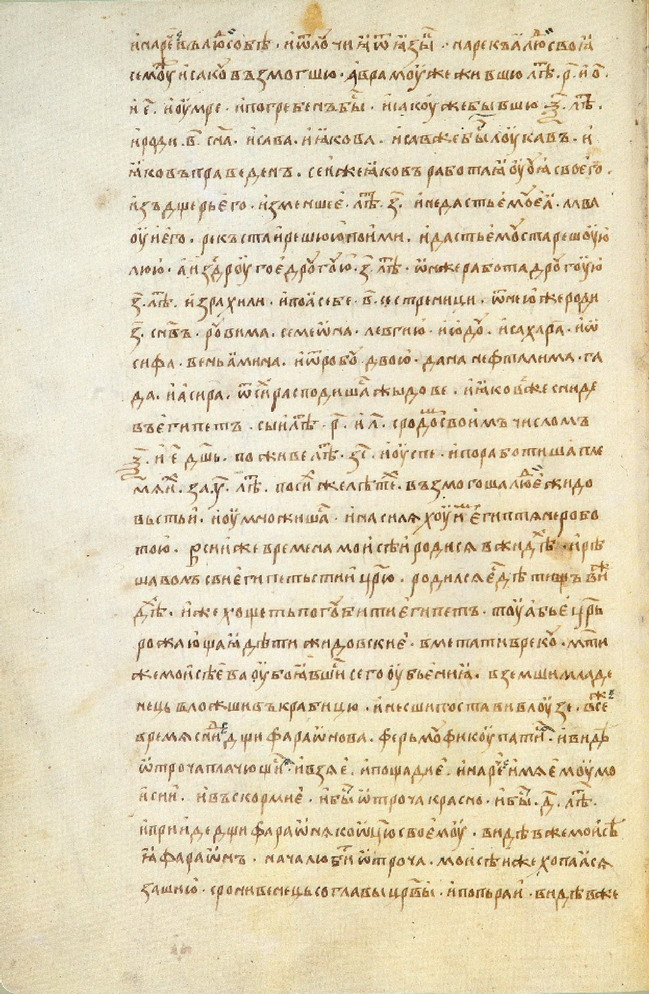
103

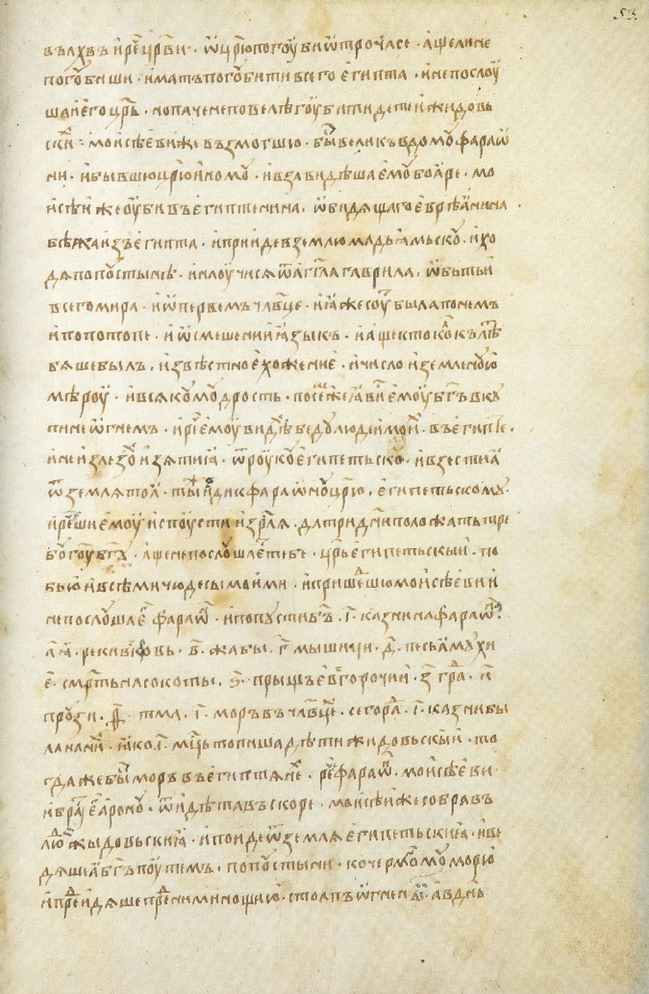
104

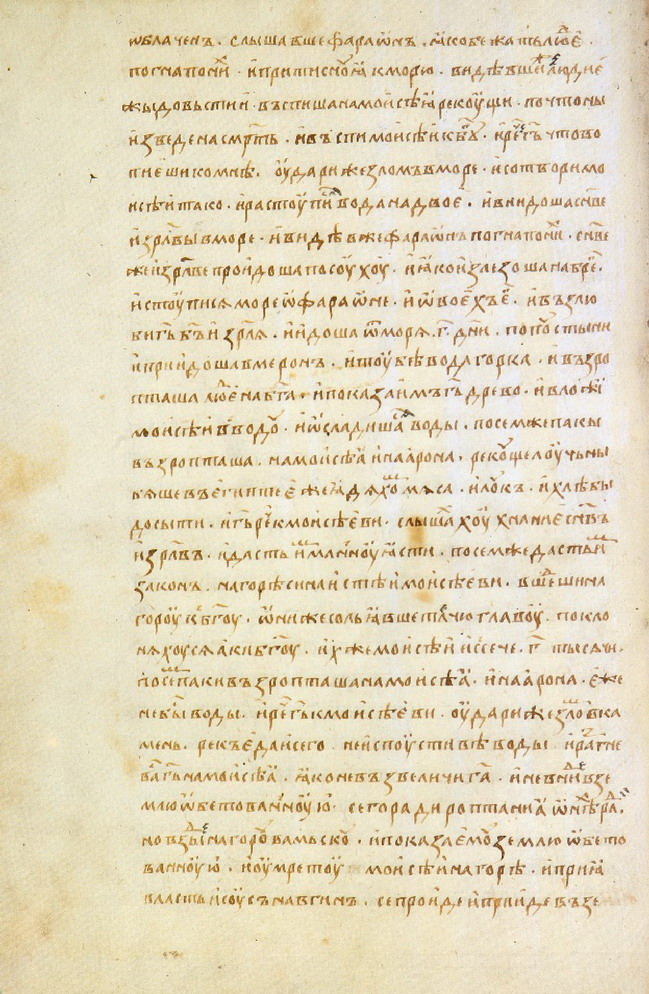
105

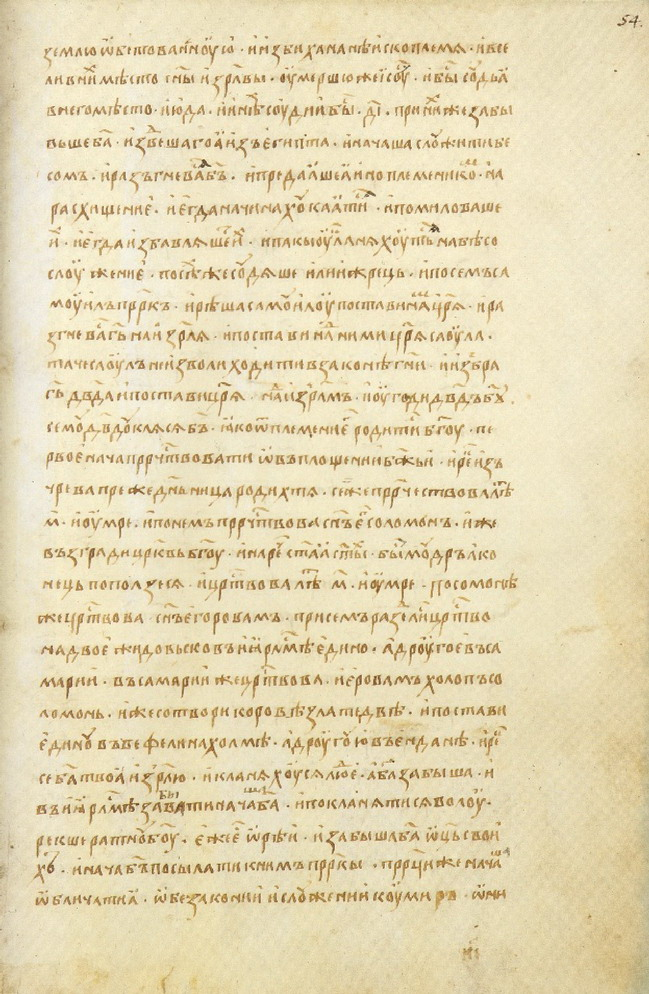
106

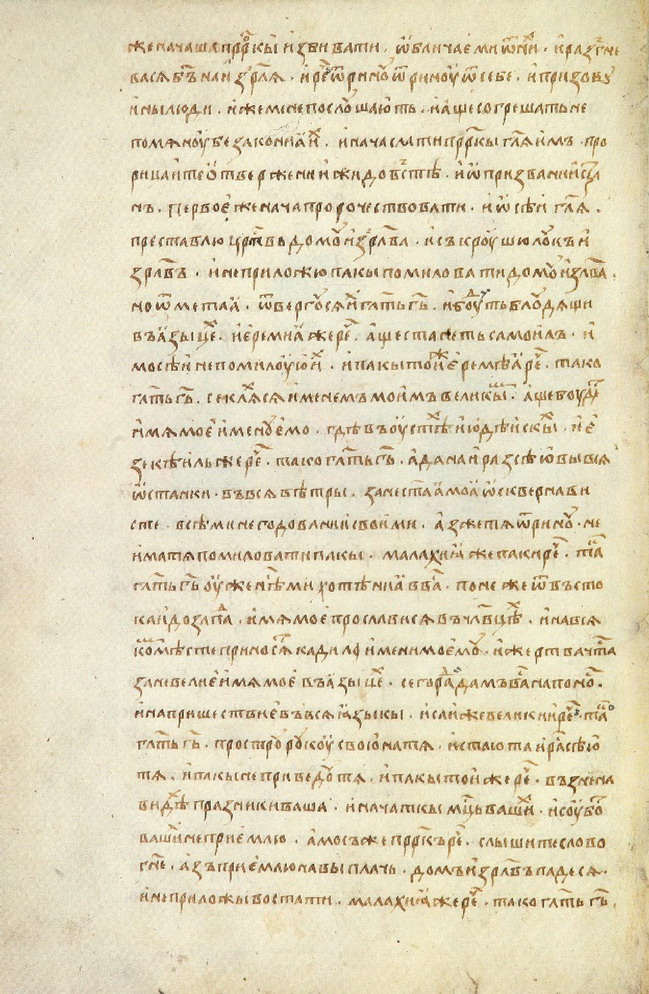
107

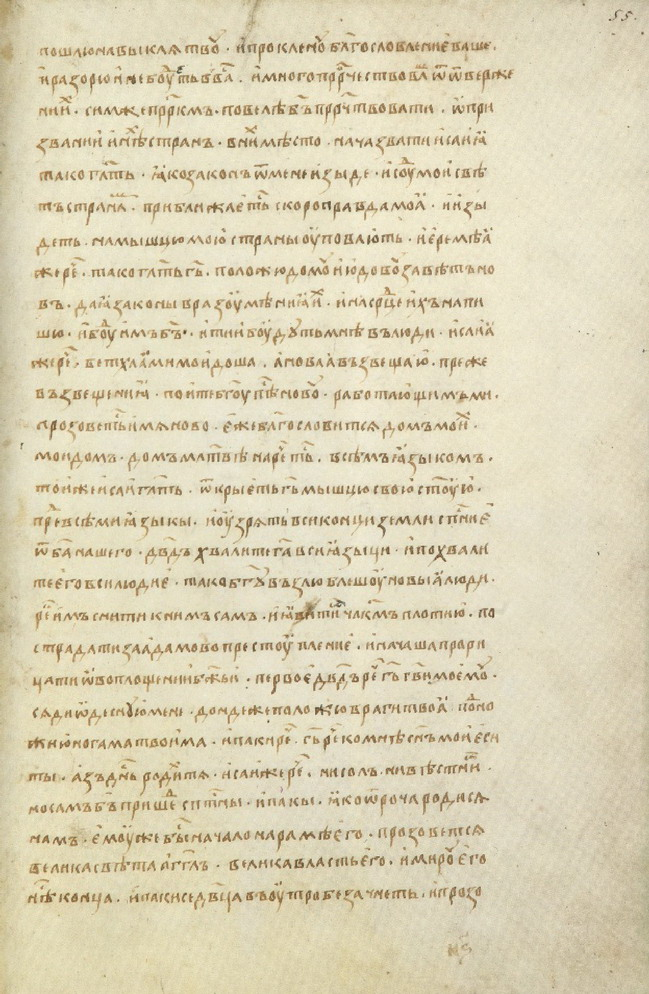
108

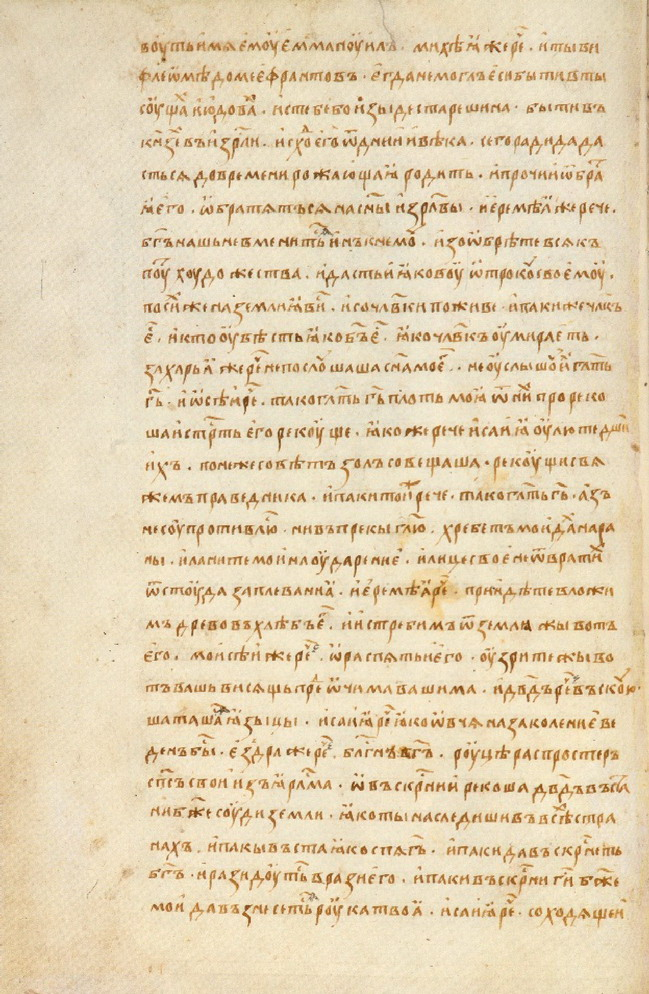
109

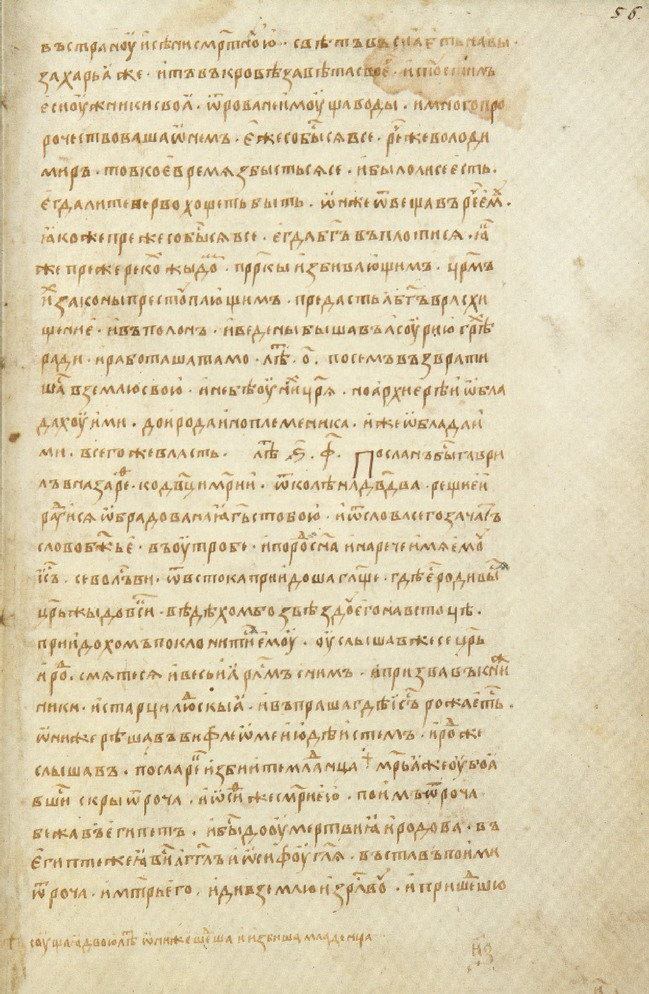
110

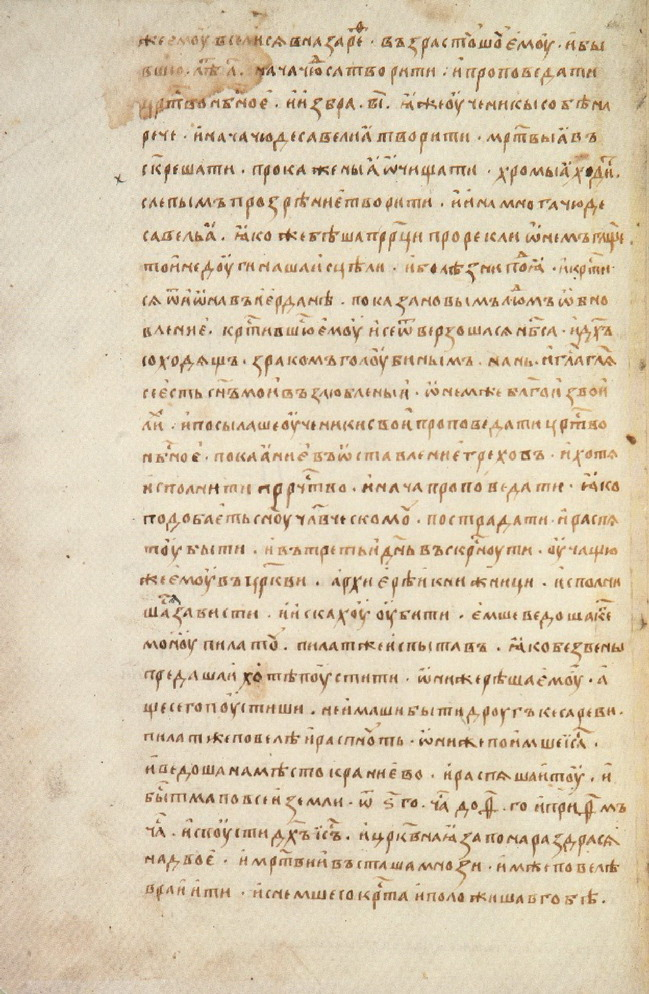
111

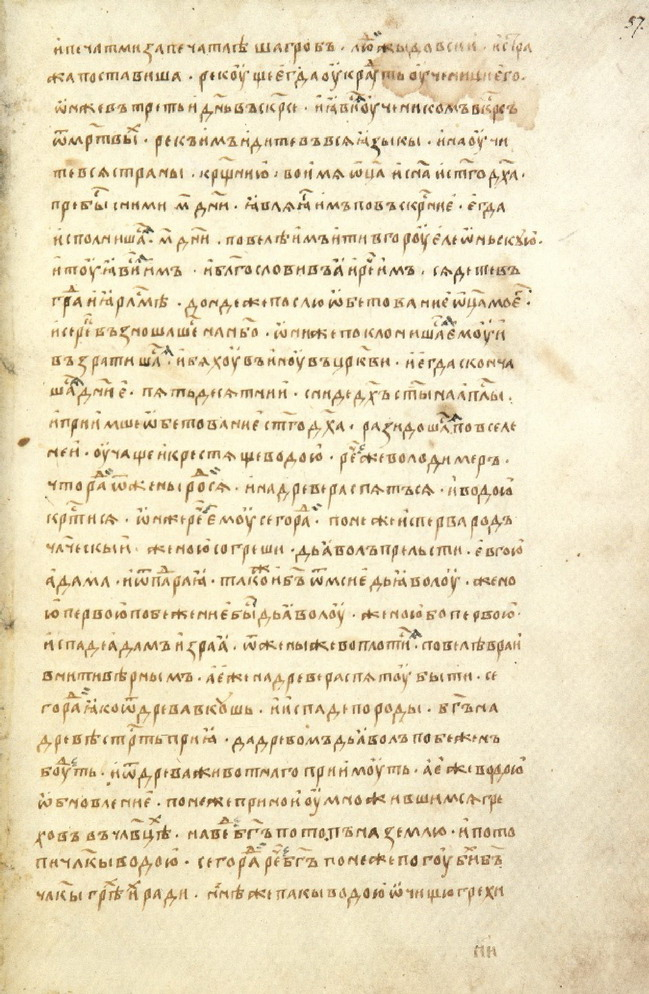
112

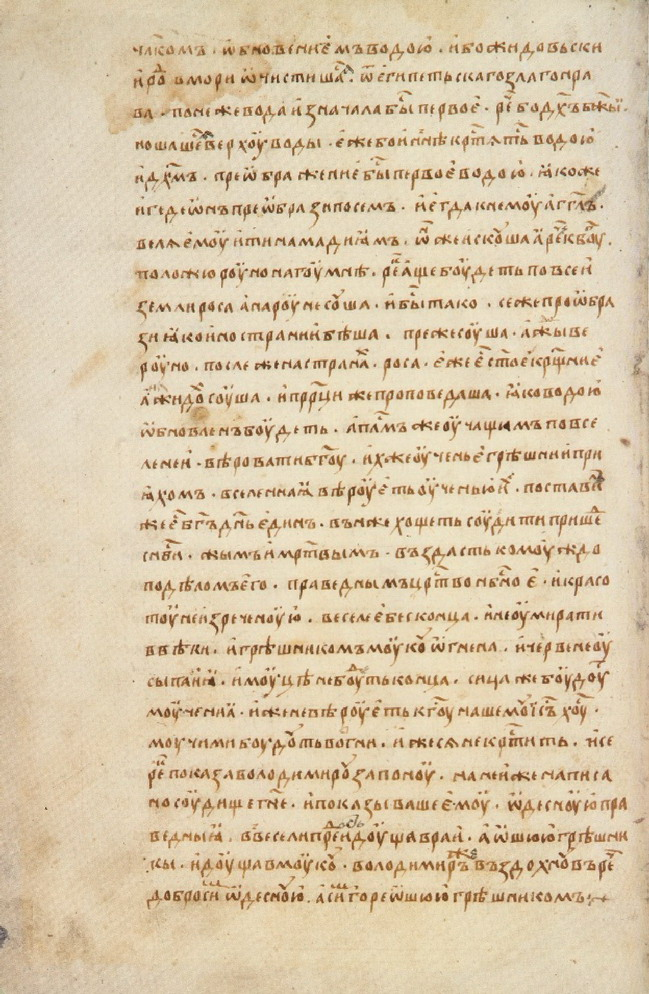
113

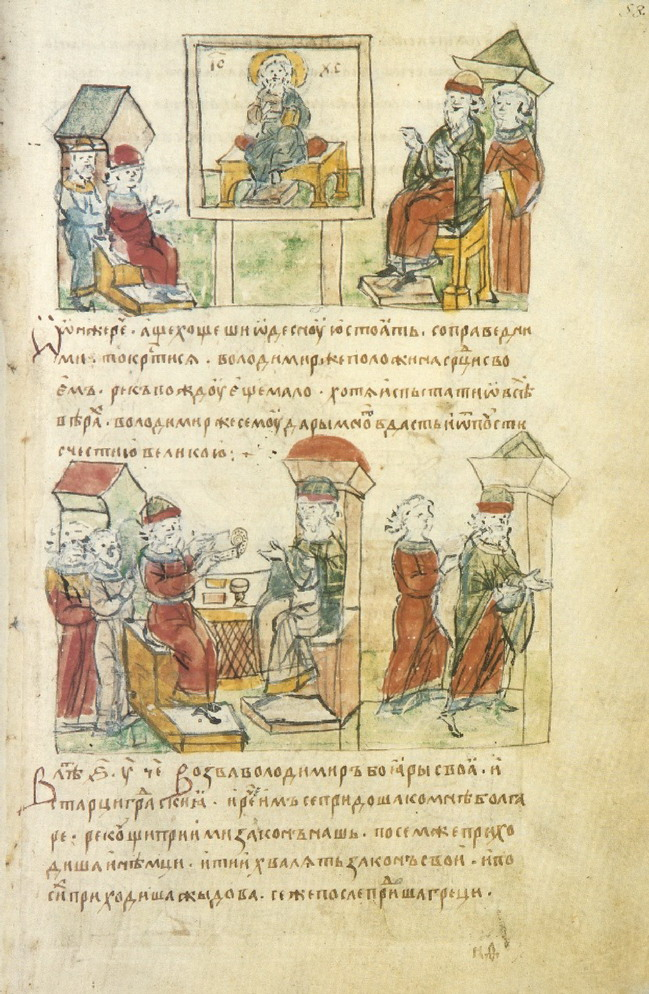
114

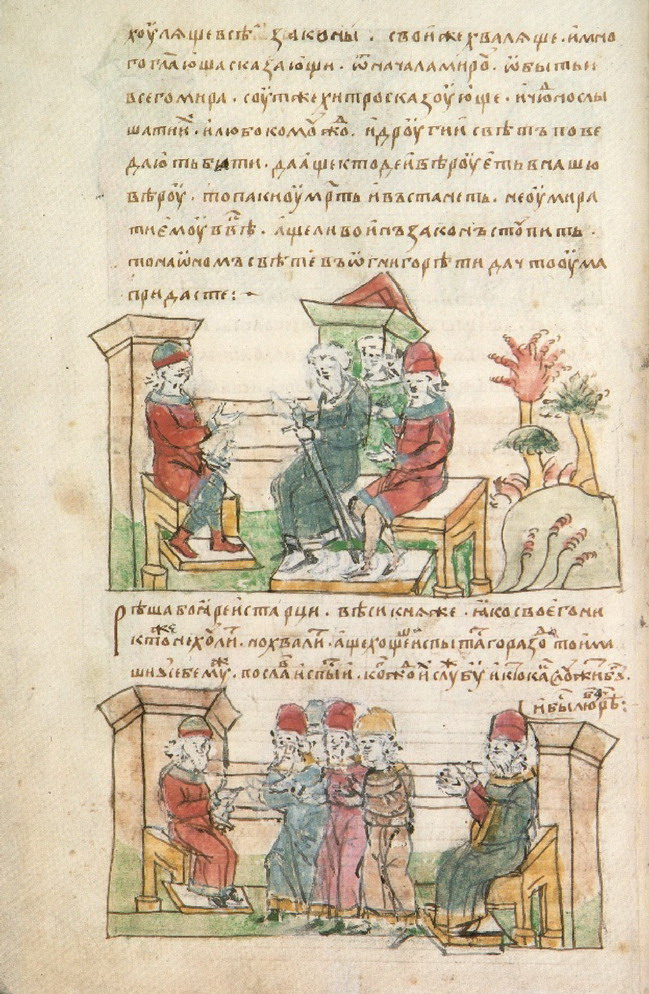
115

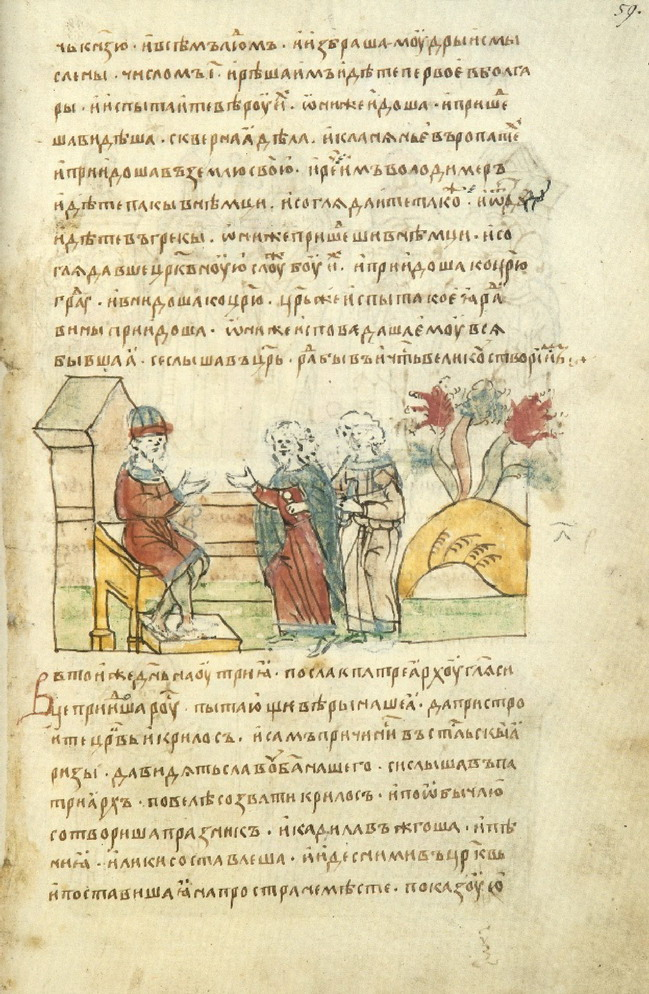
116

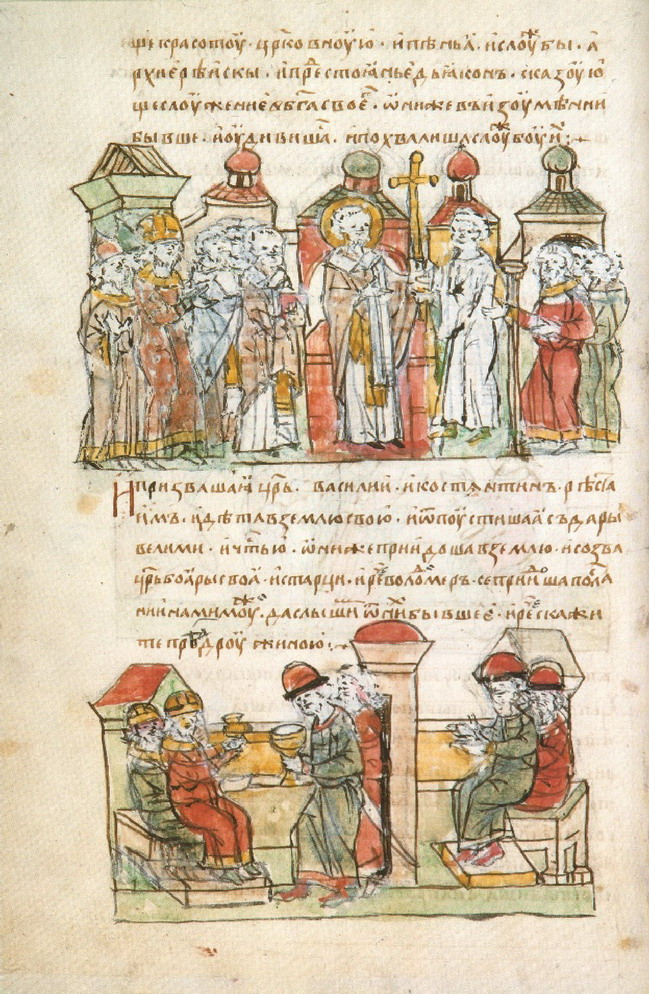
117

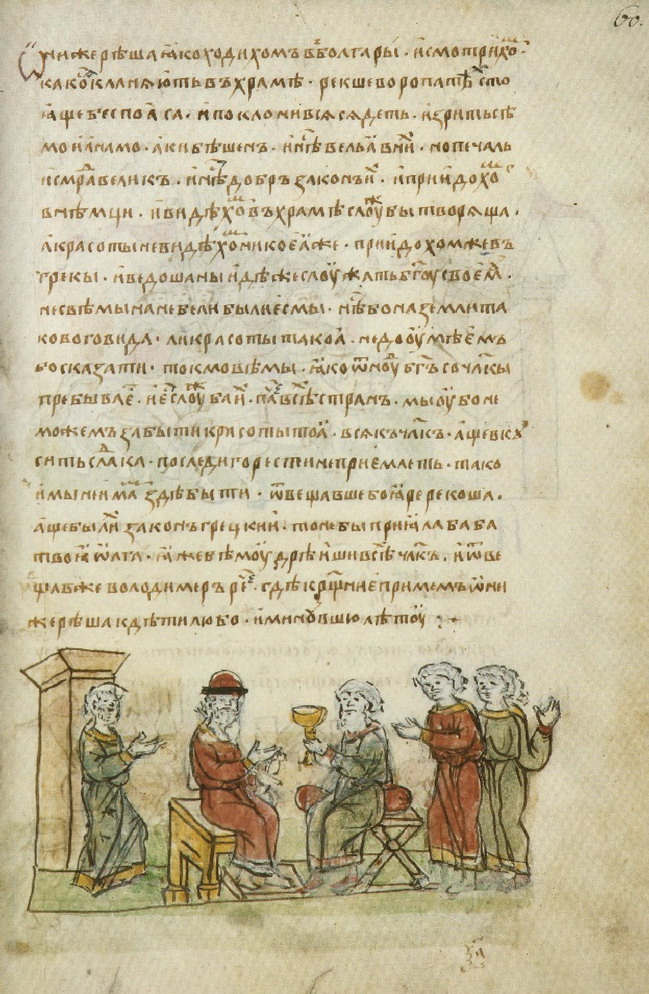
118

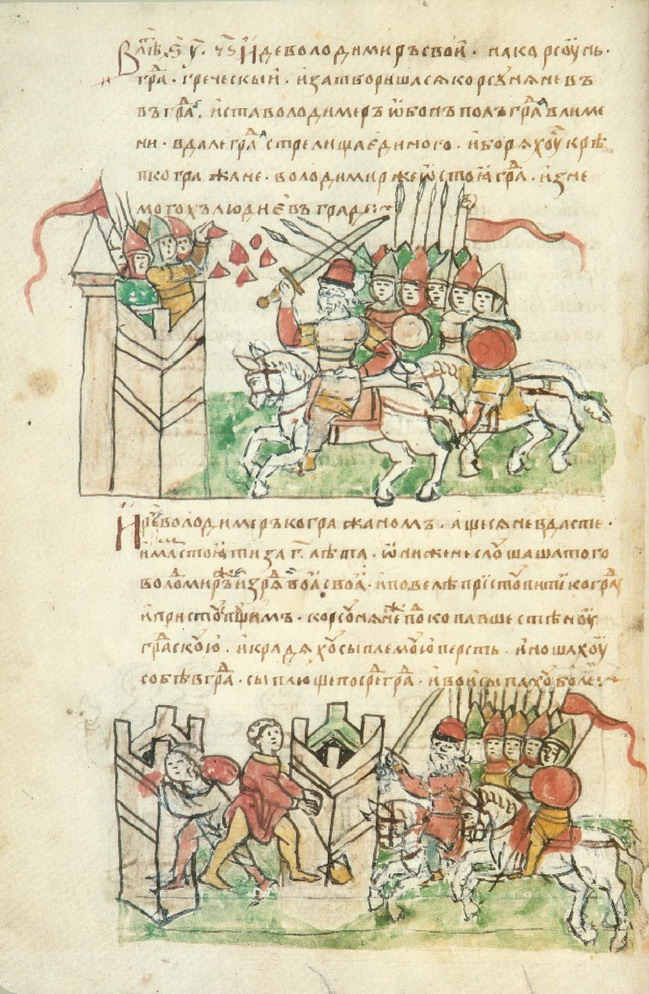
119

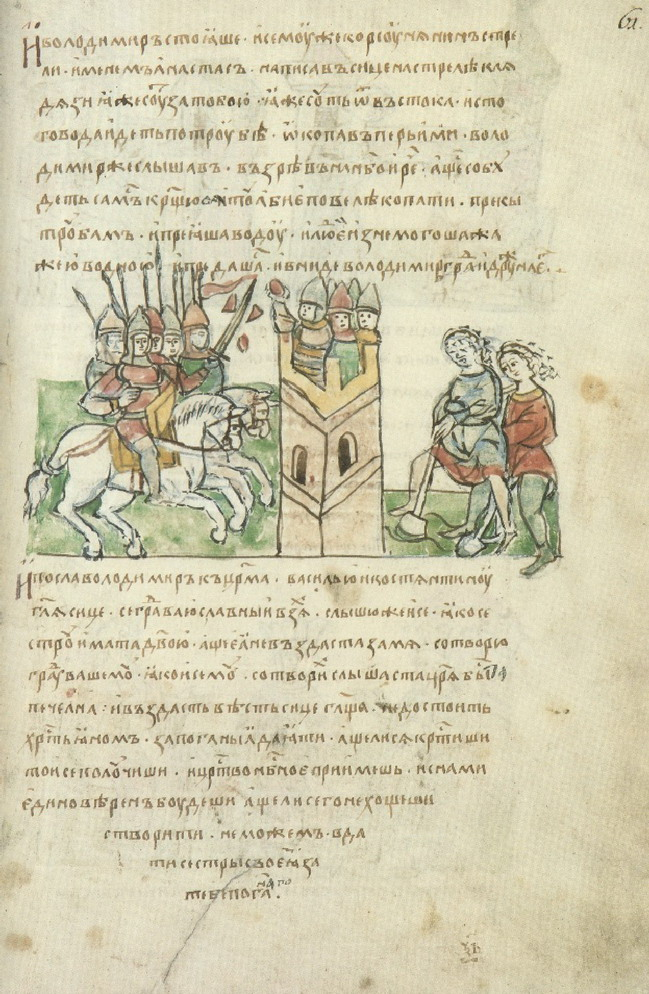
120

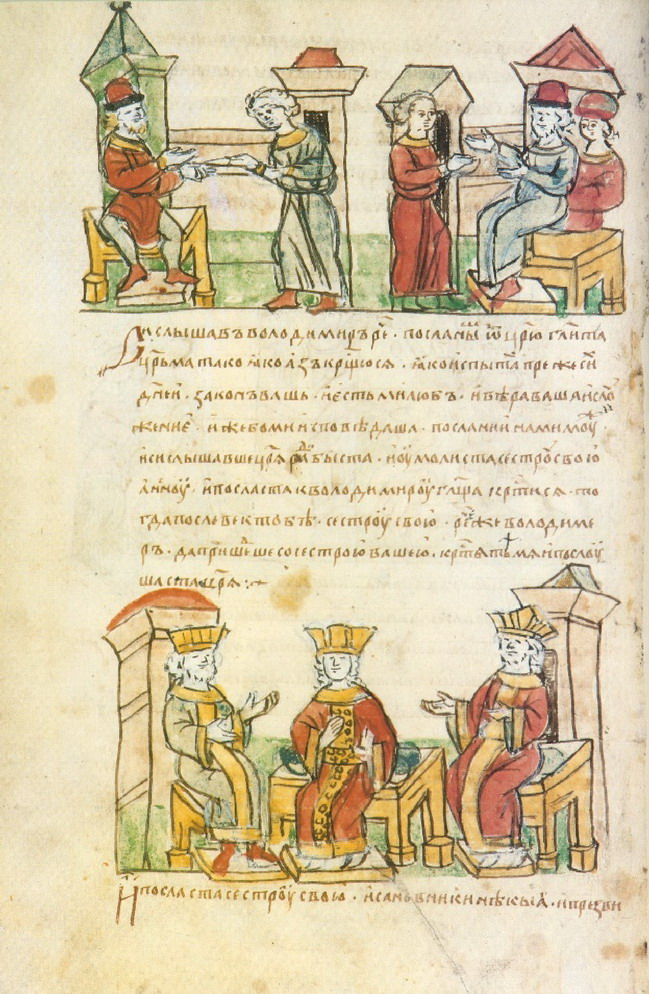
121

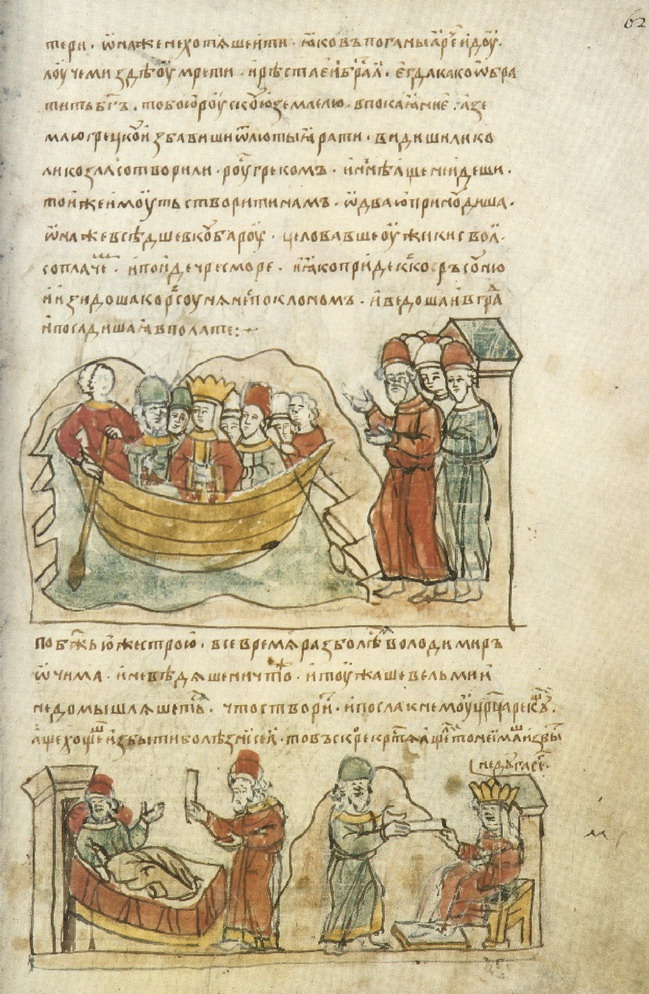
122

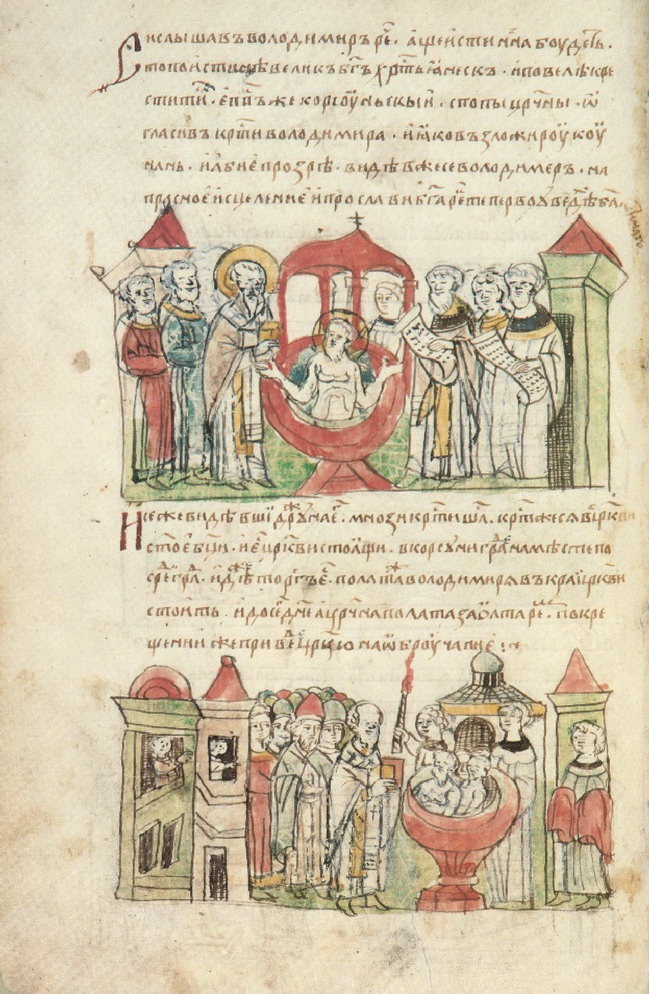
123

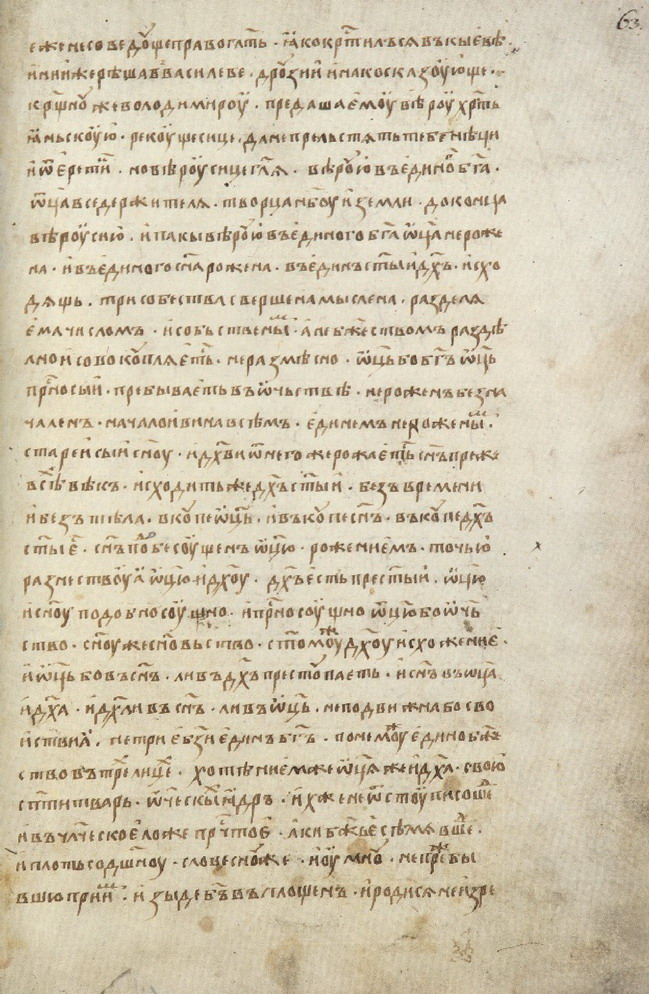
124

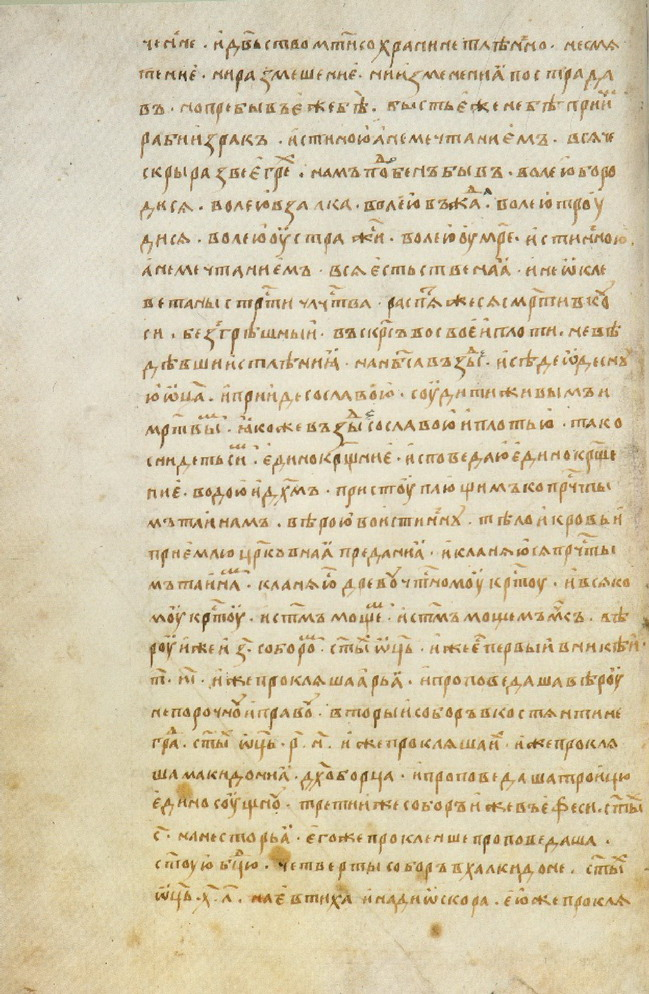
125

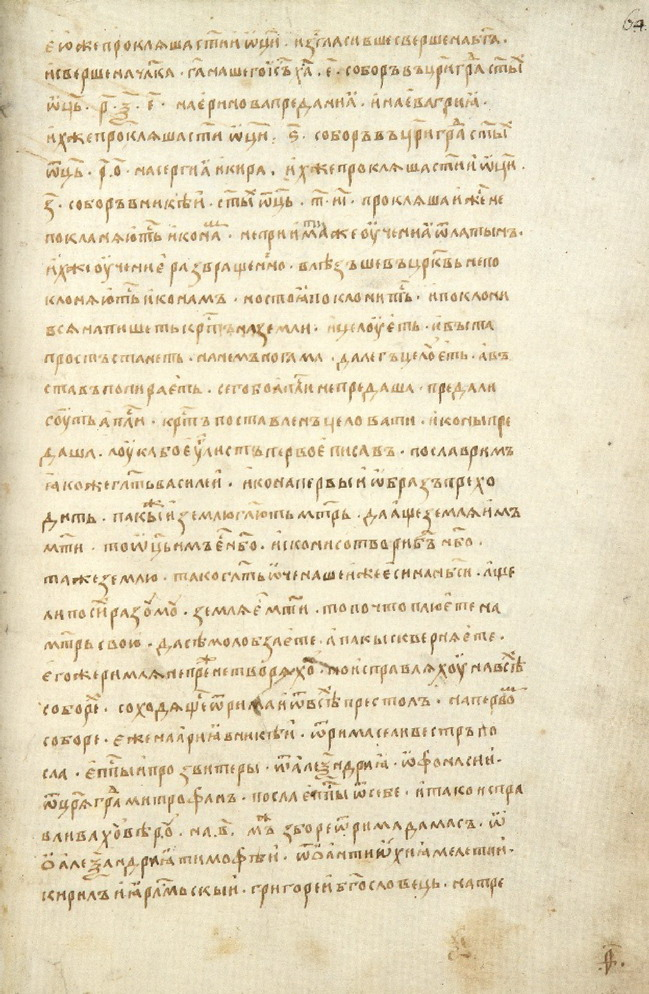
126

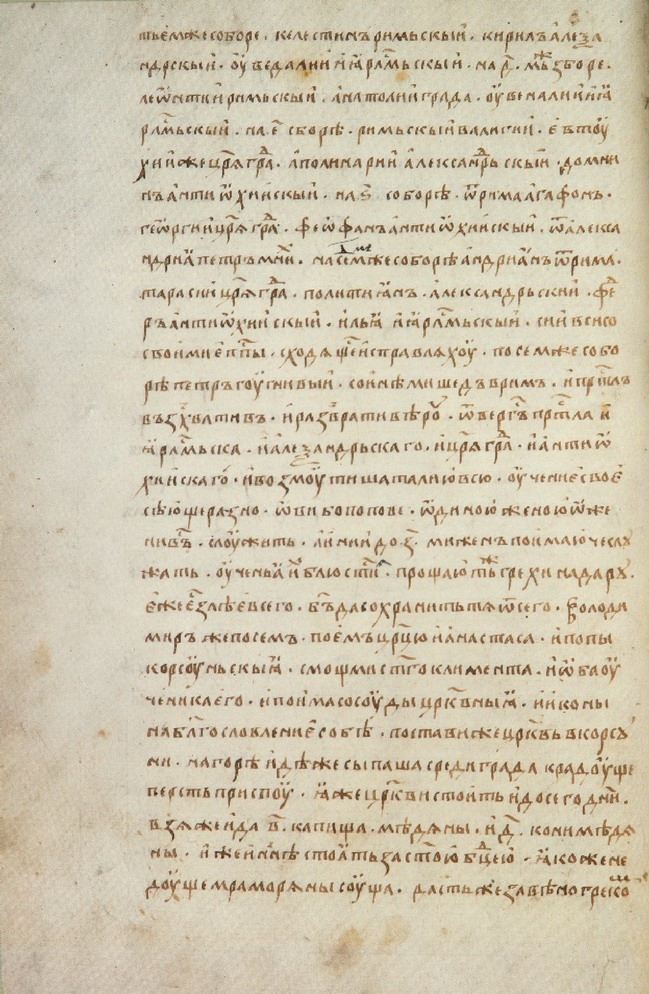
127

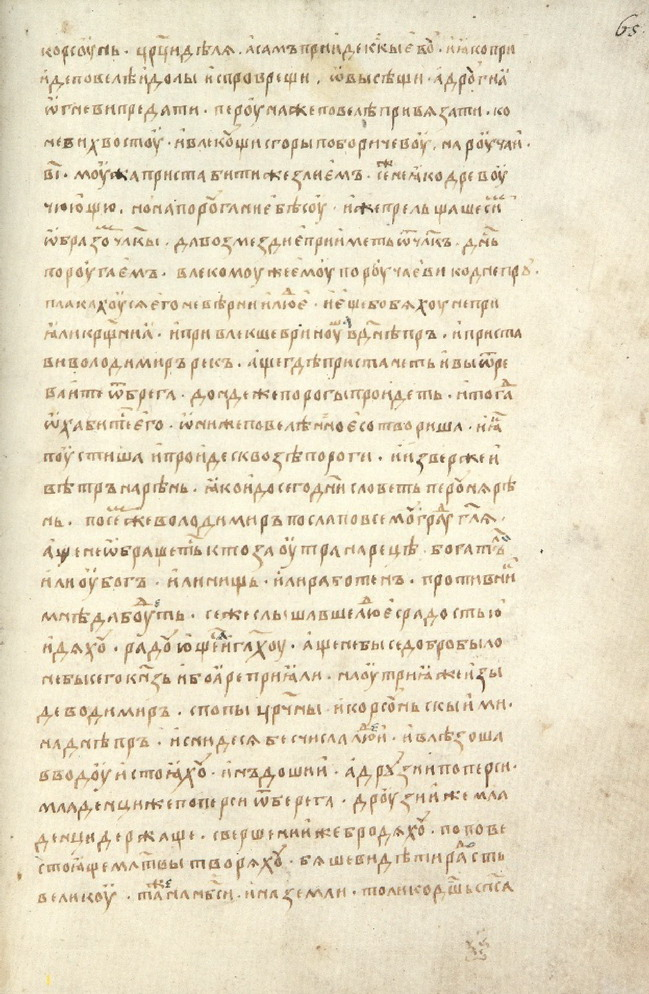
128

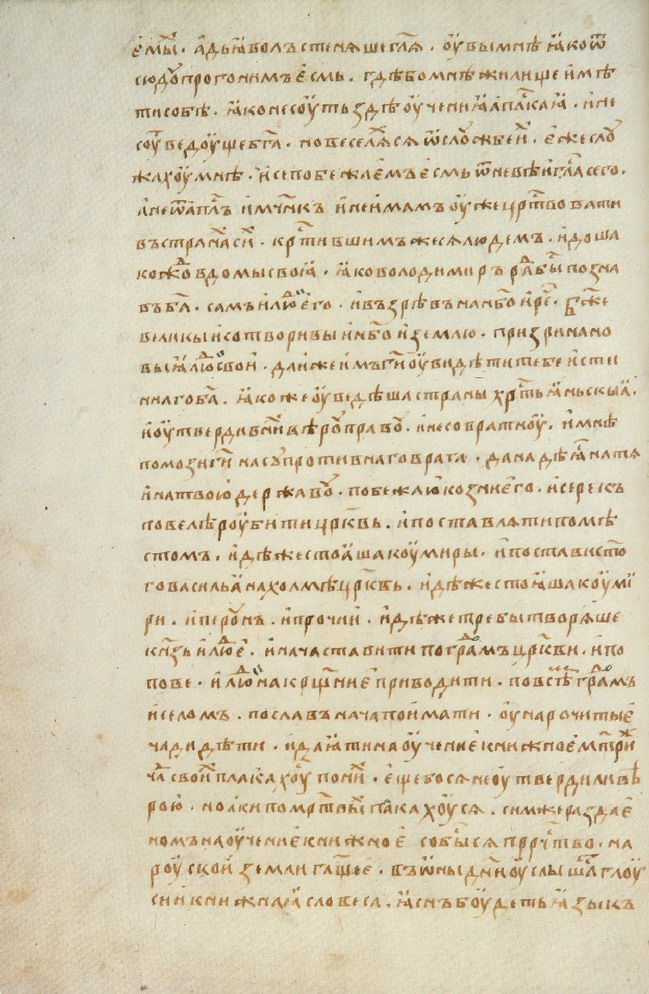
129

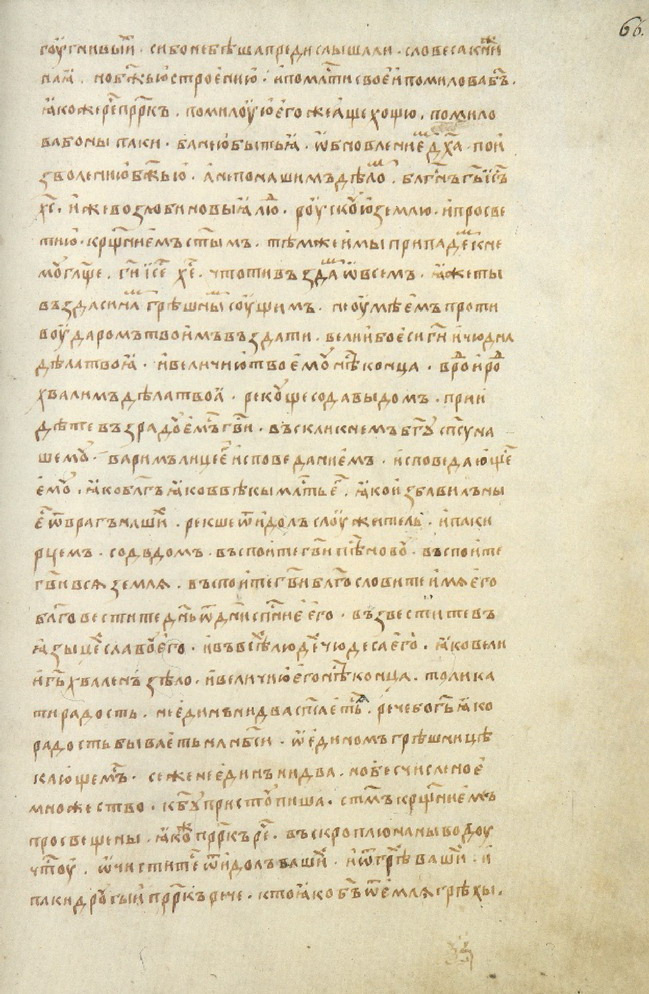
130

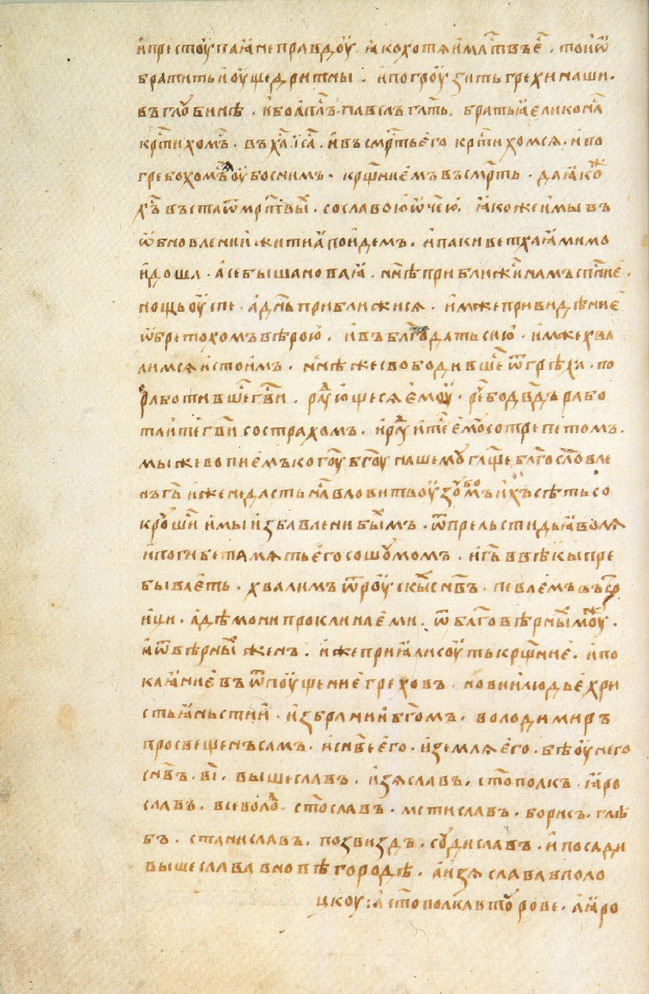
131

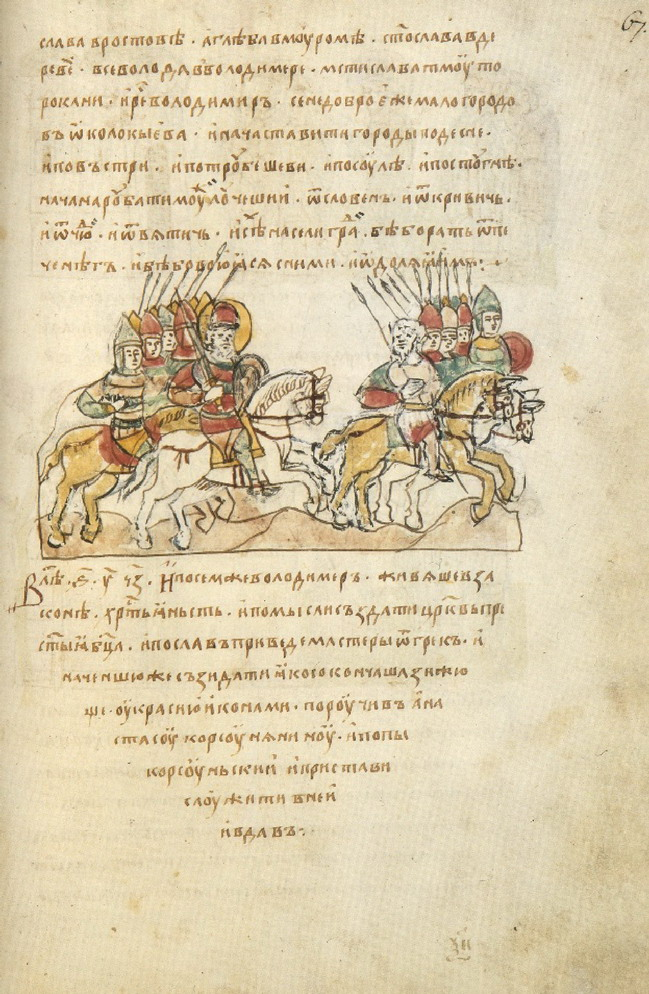
132

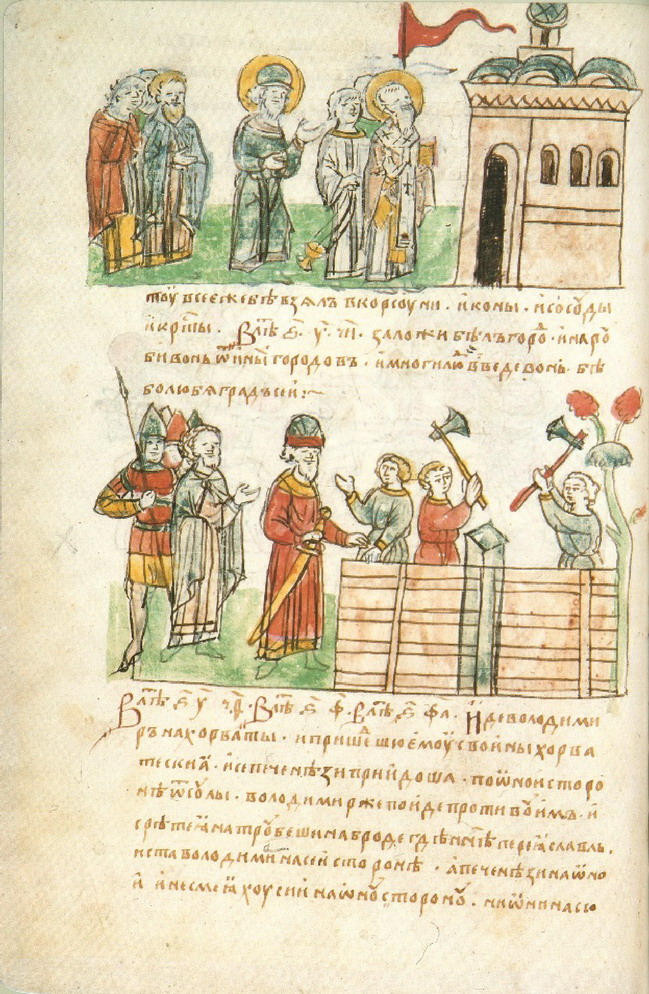
133

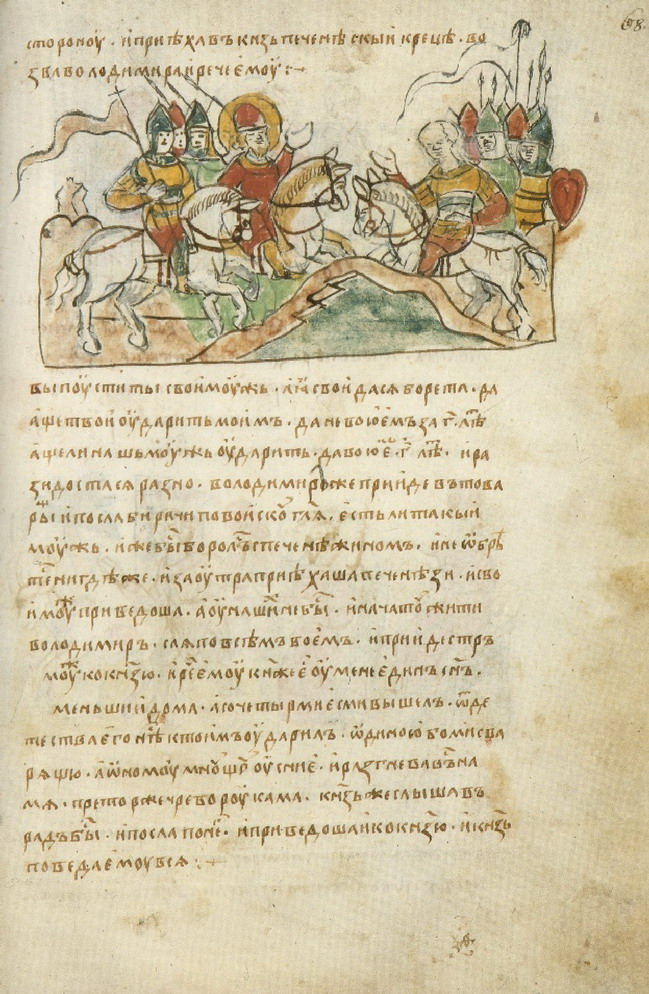
134

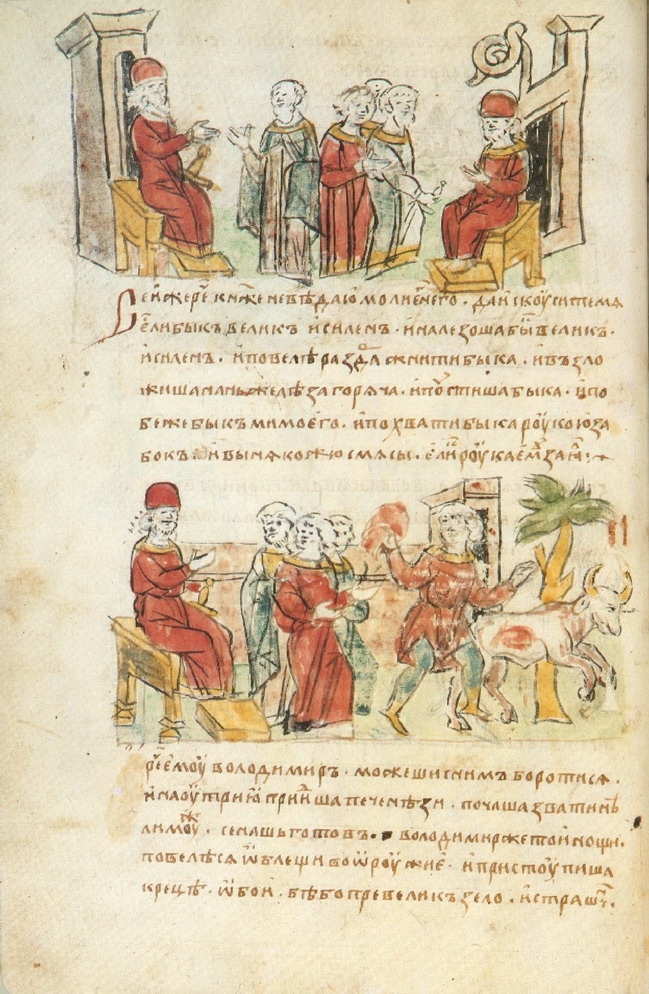
135

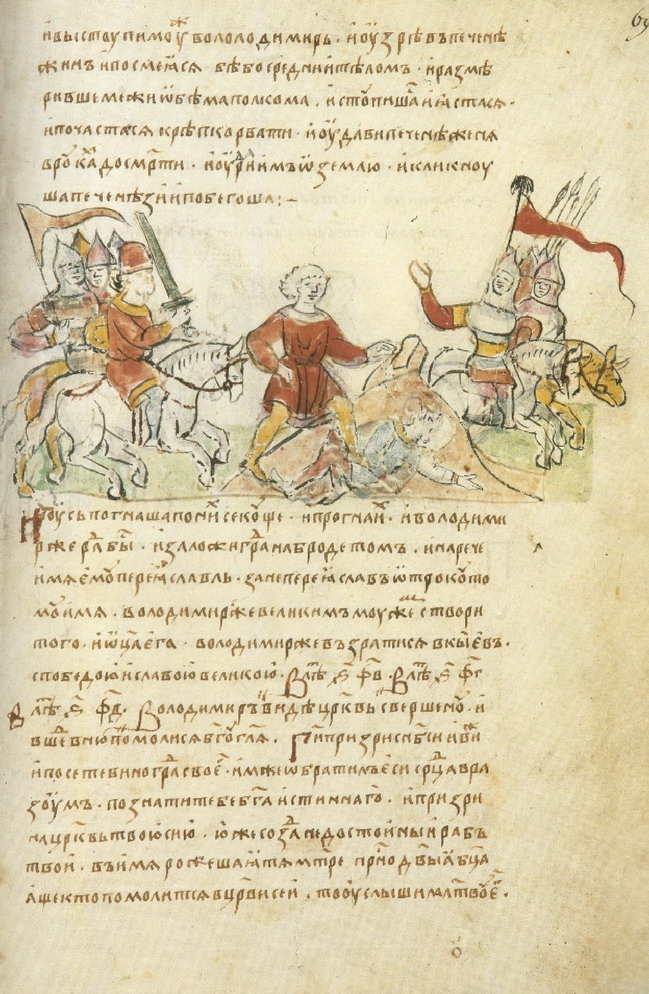
136

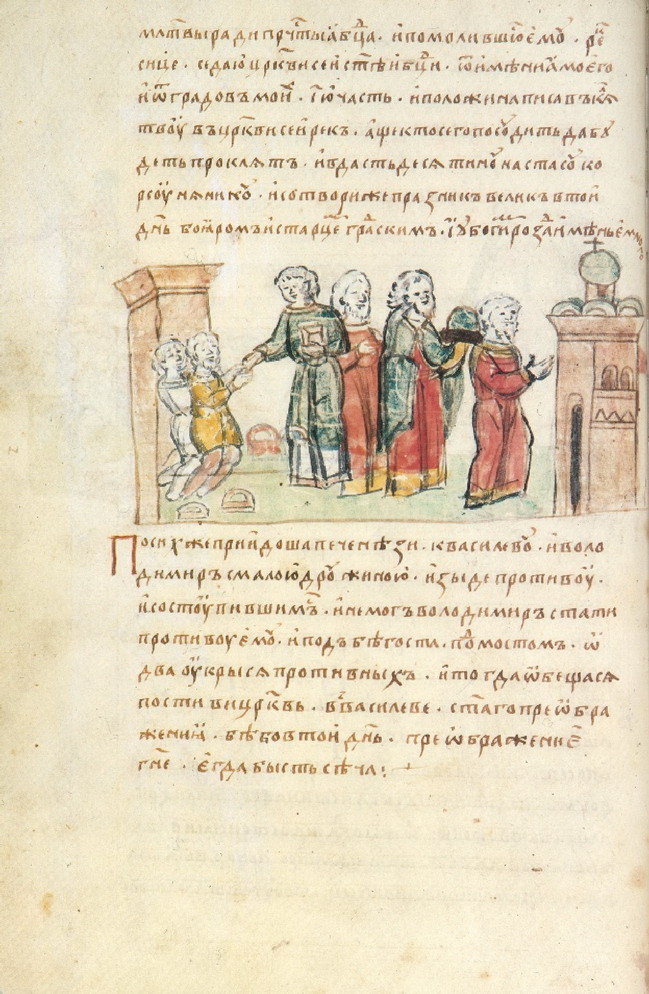
137

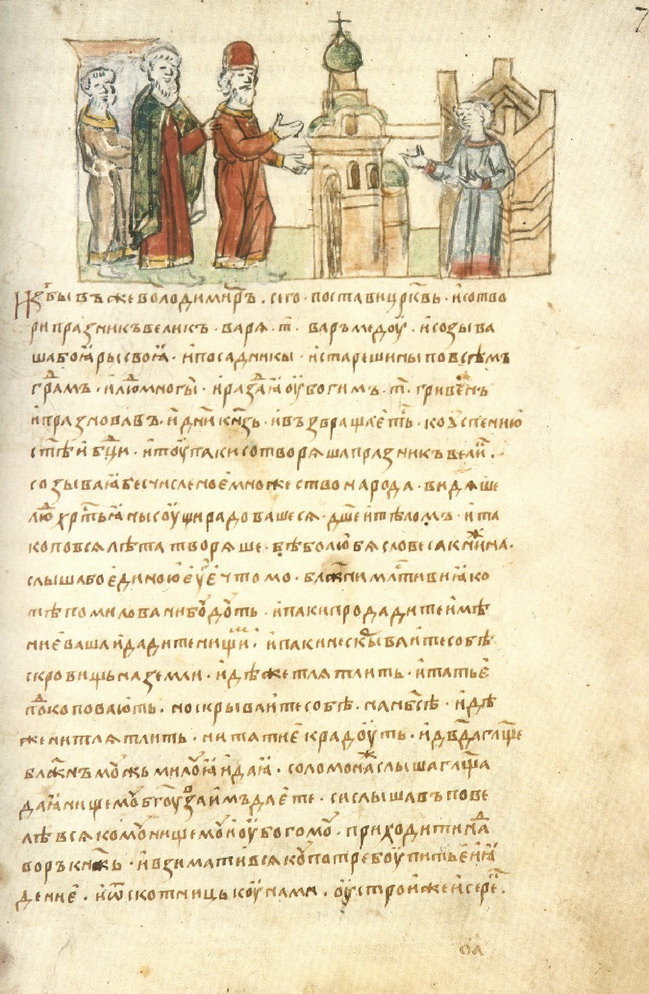
138

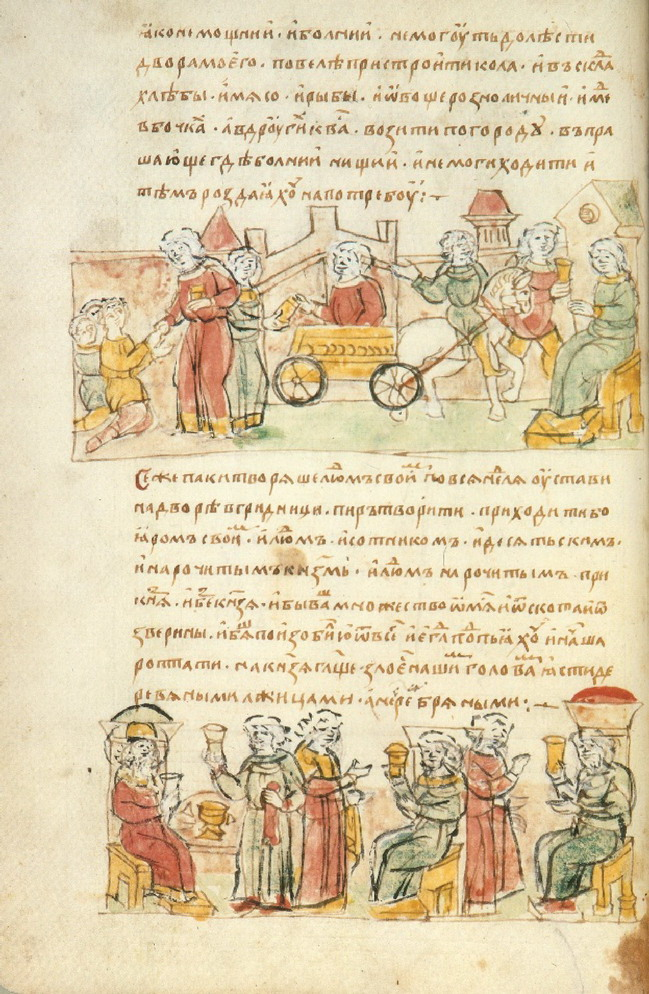
139

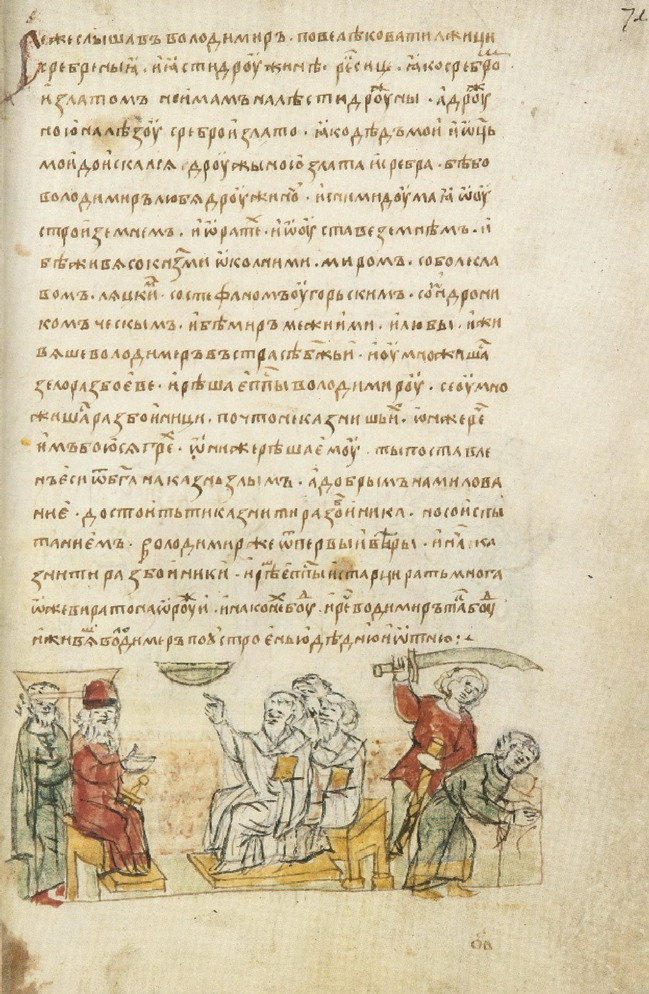
140

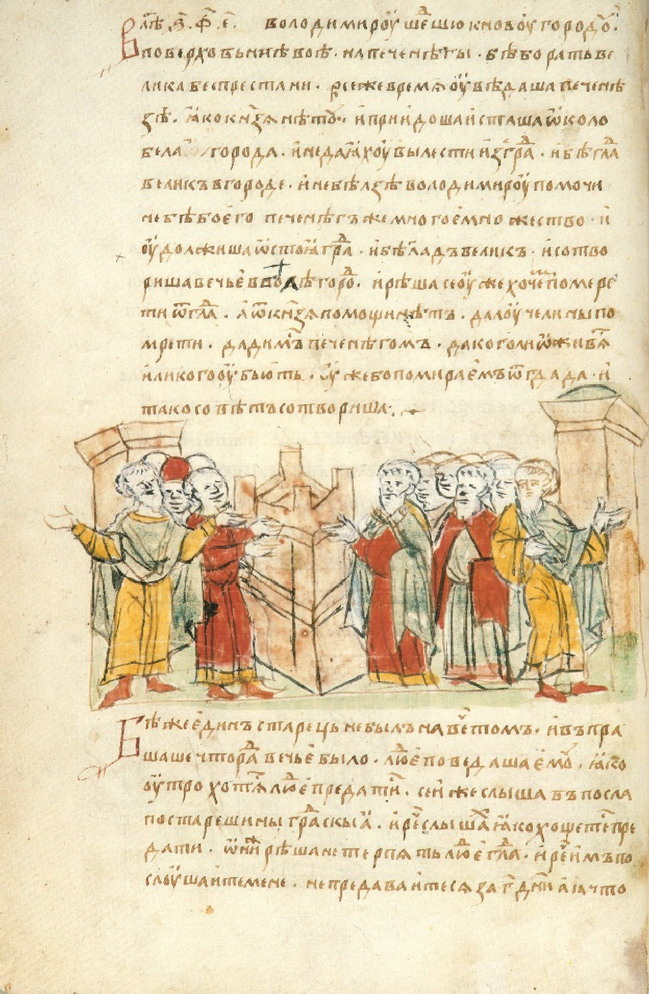
141

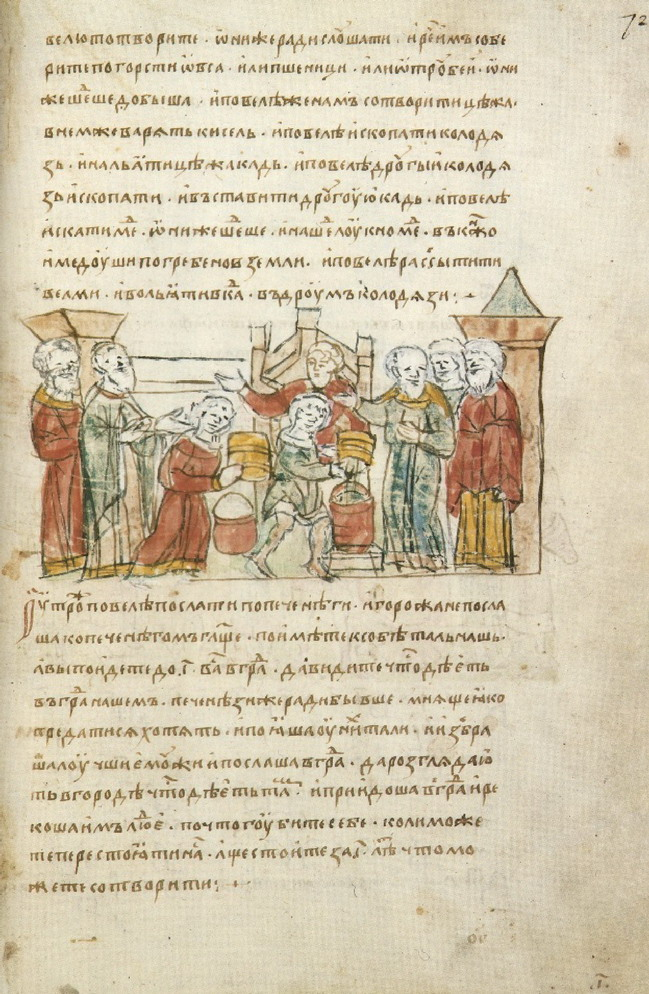
142

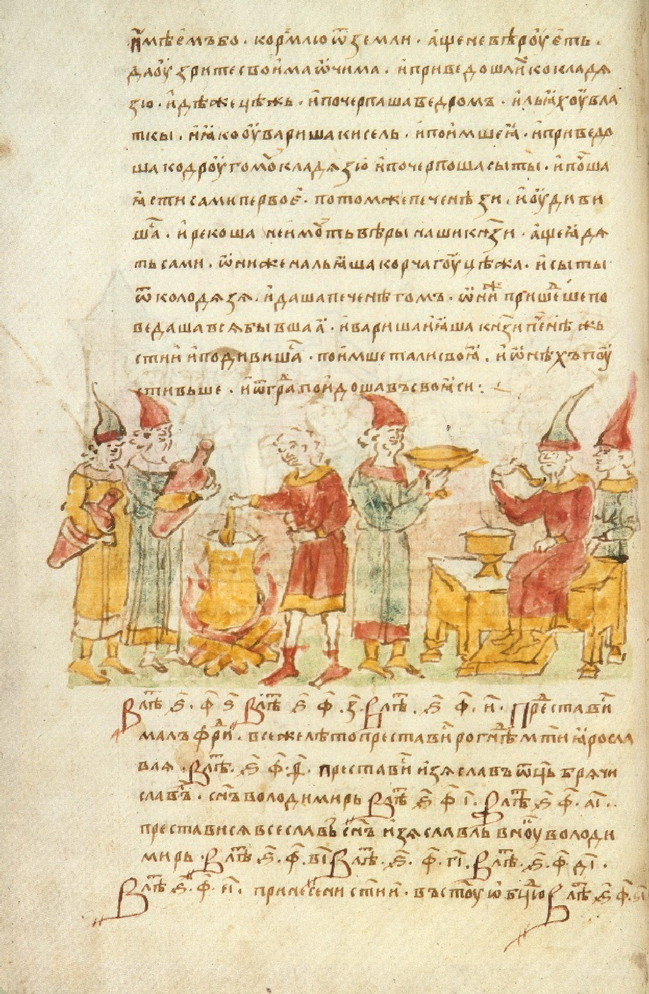
143

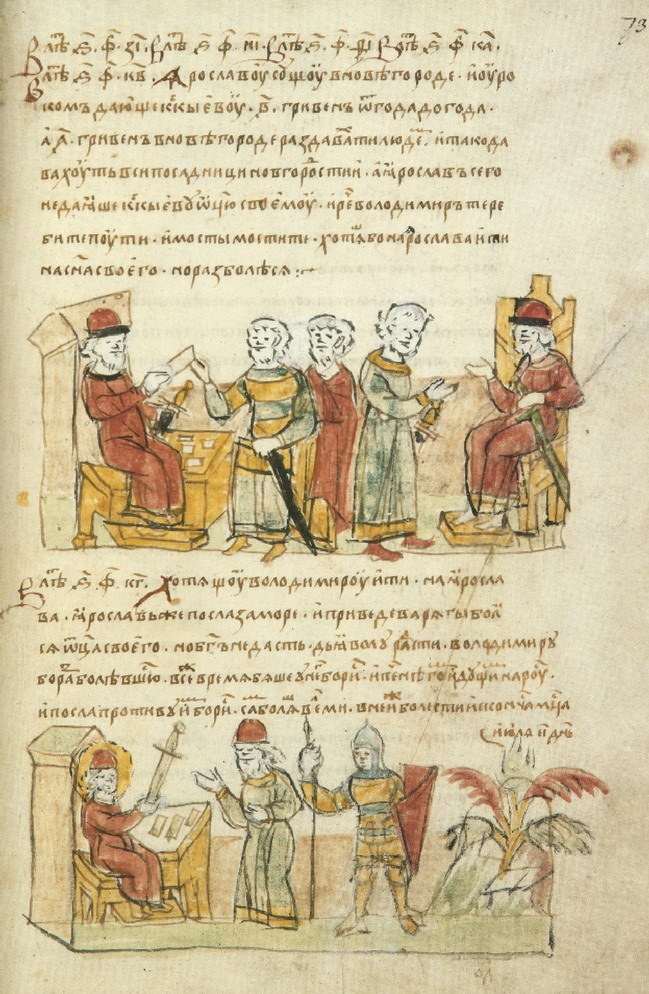
144

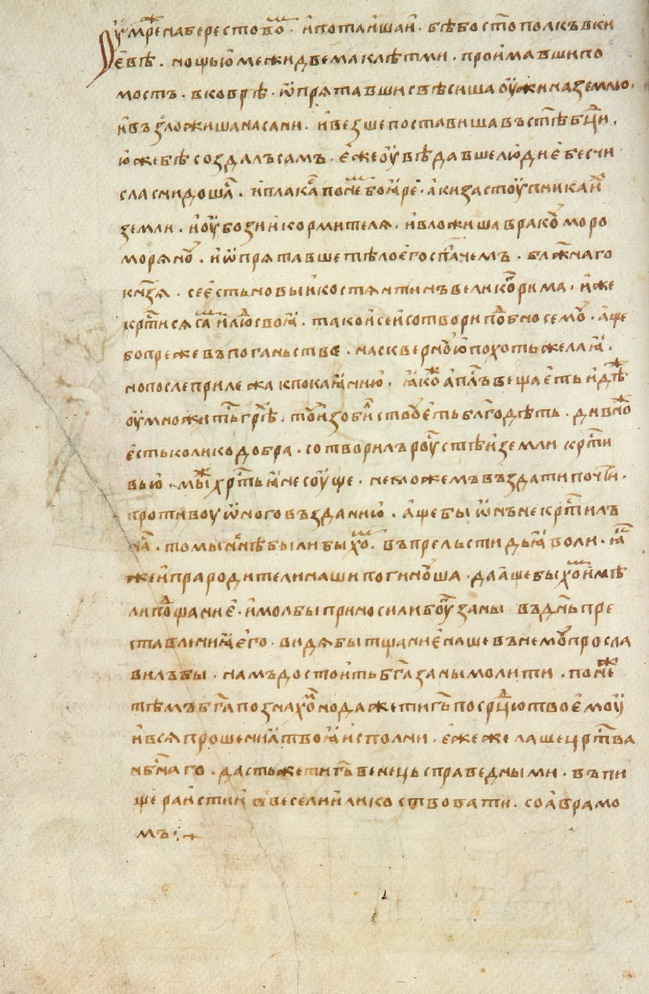
145

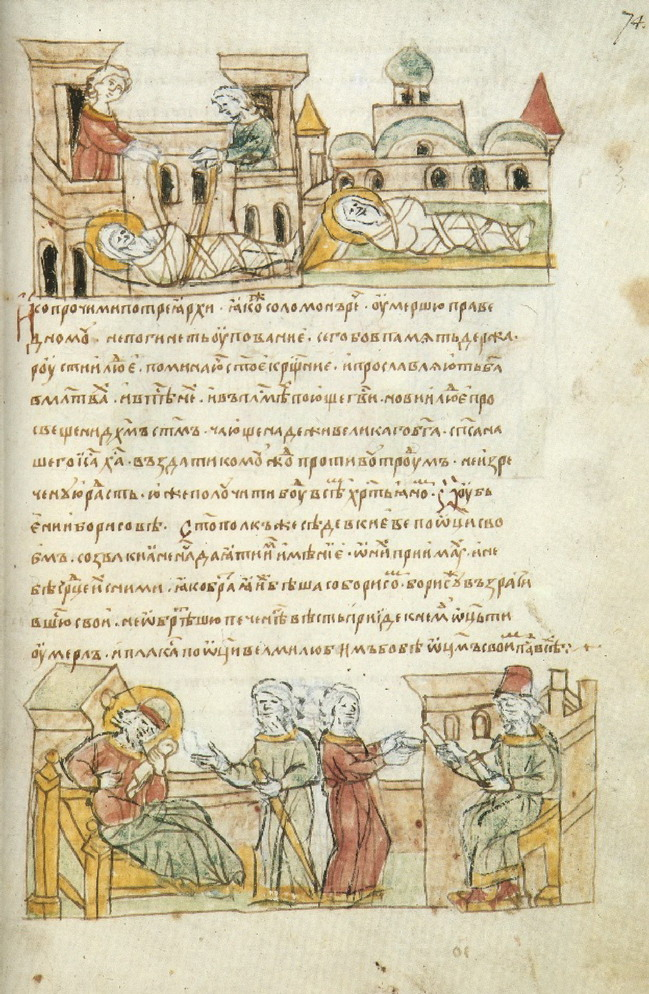
146

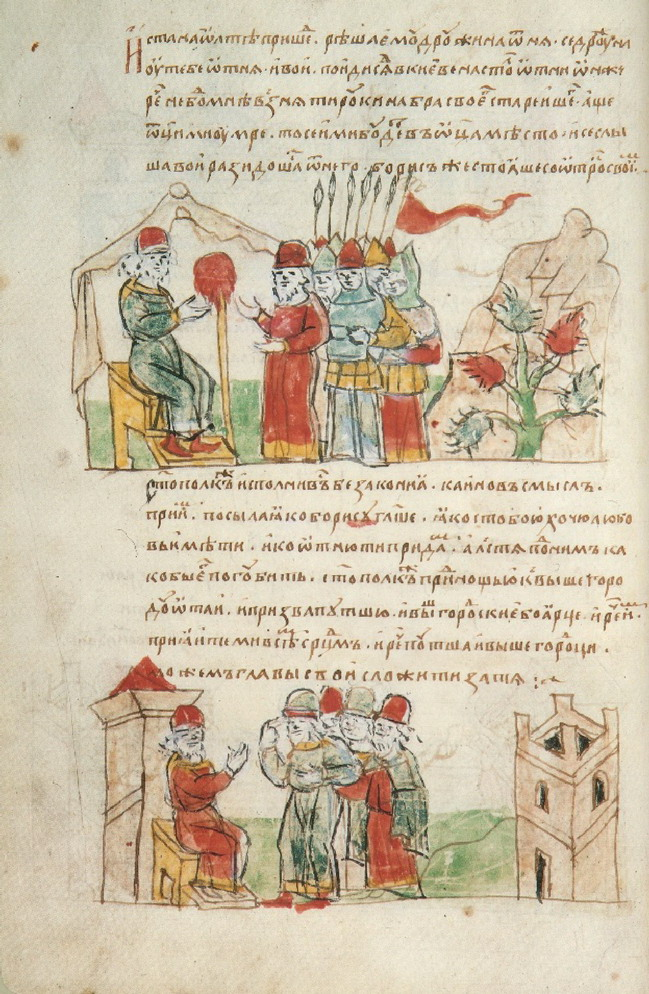
147

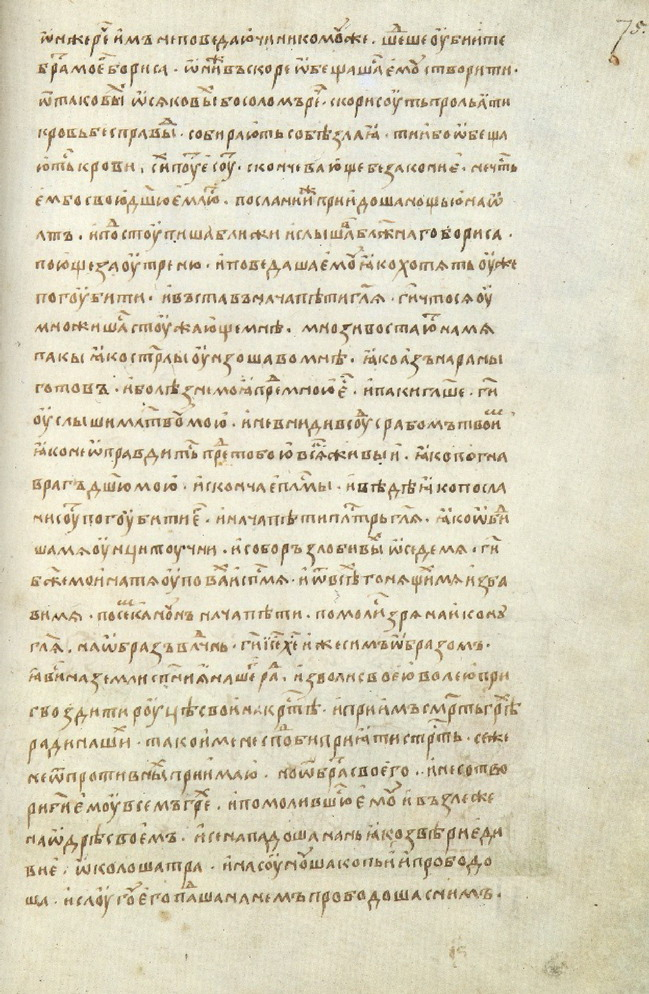
148

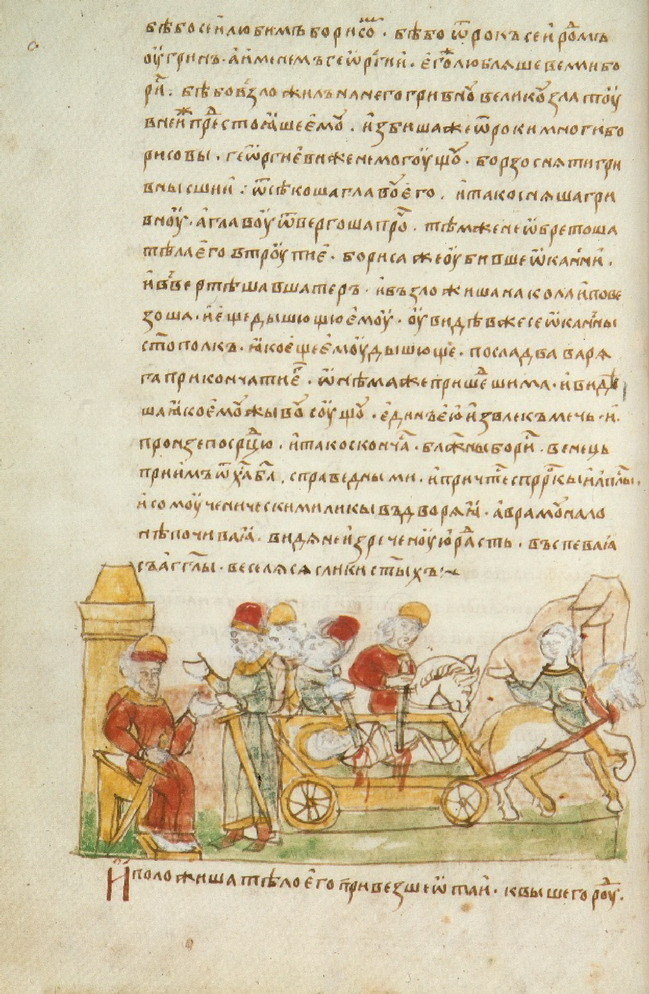
149

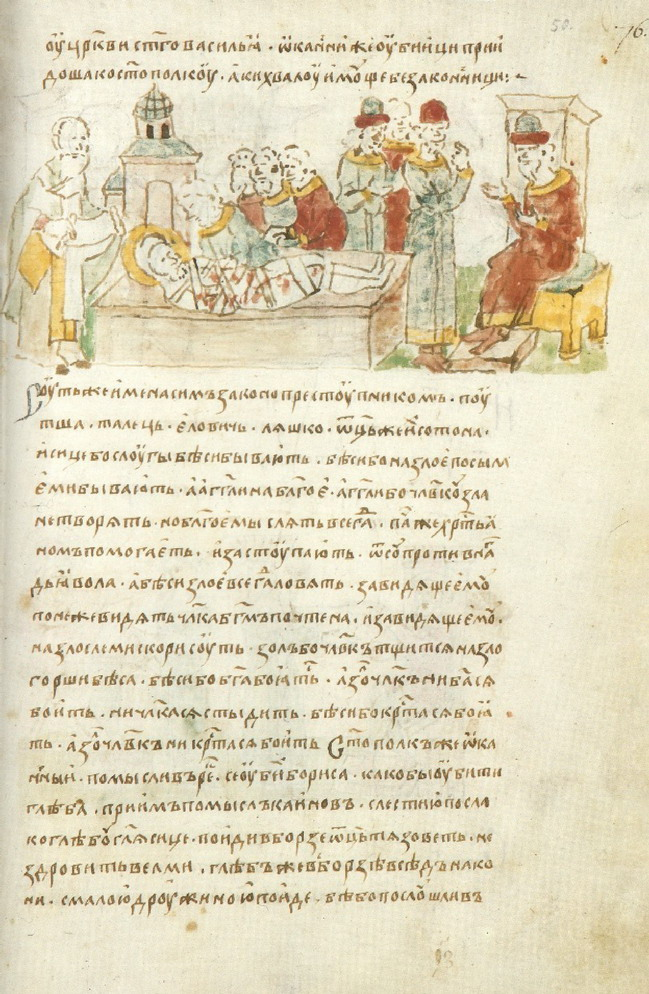
150

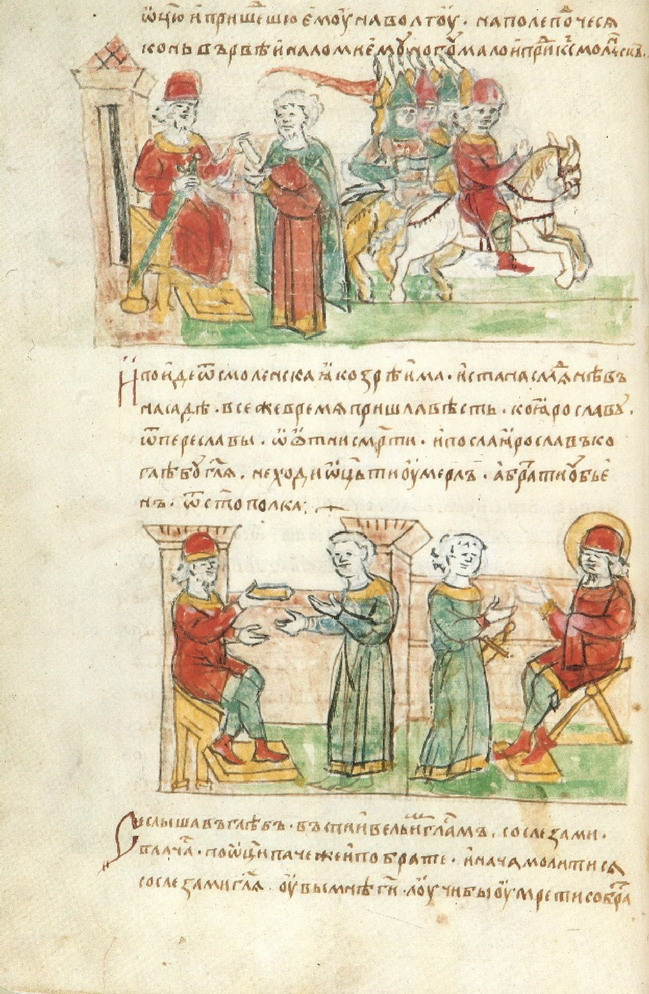
151

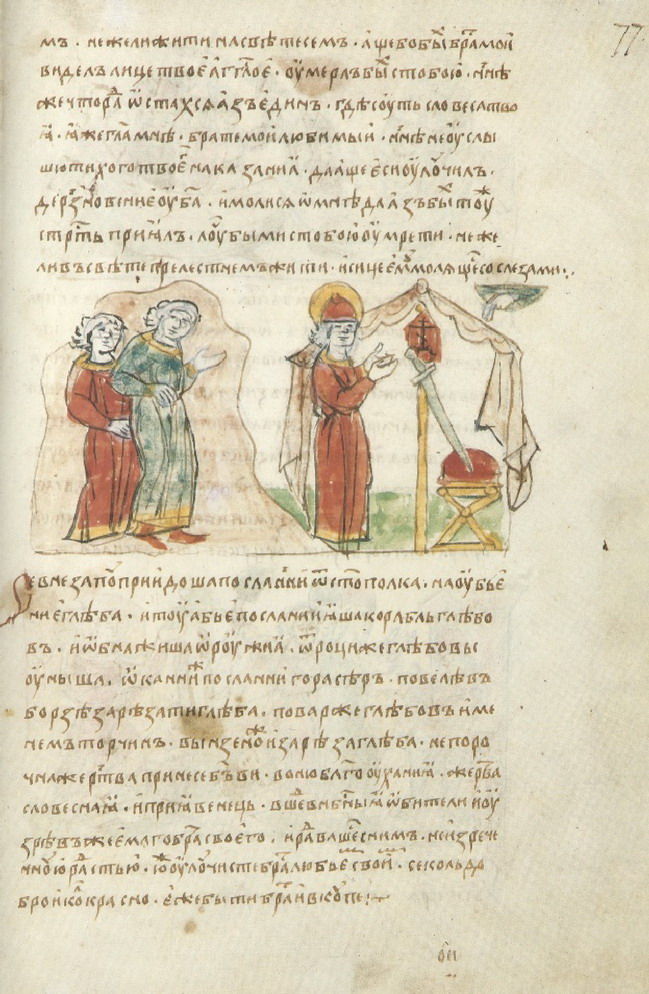
152

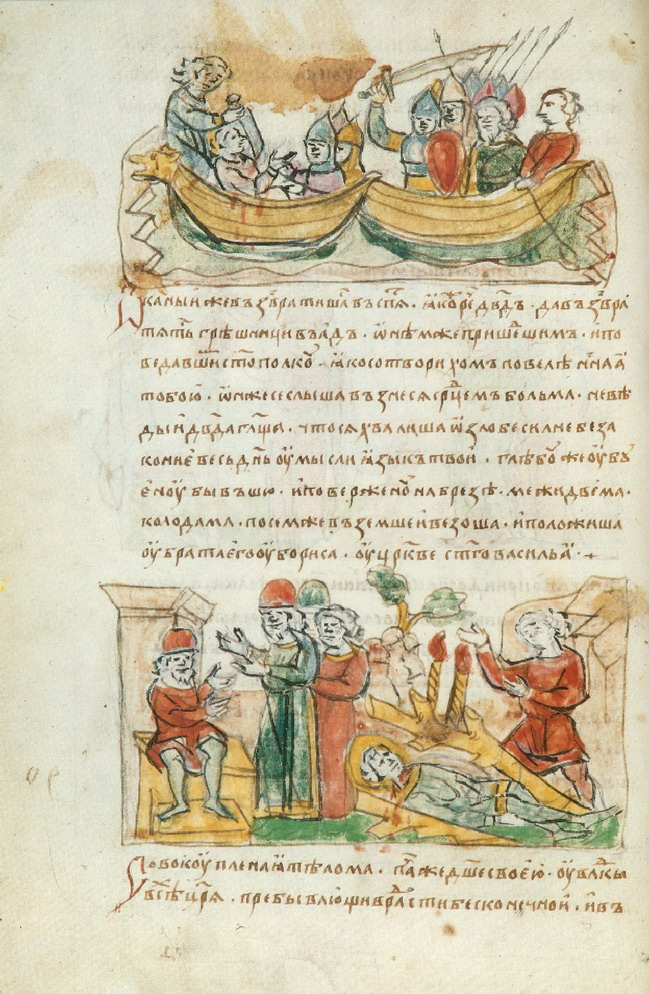
153

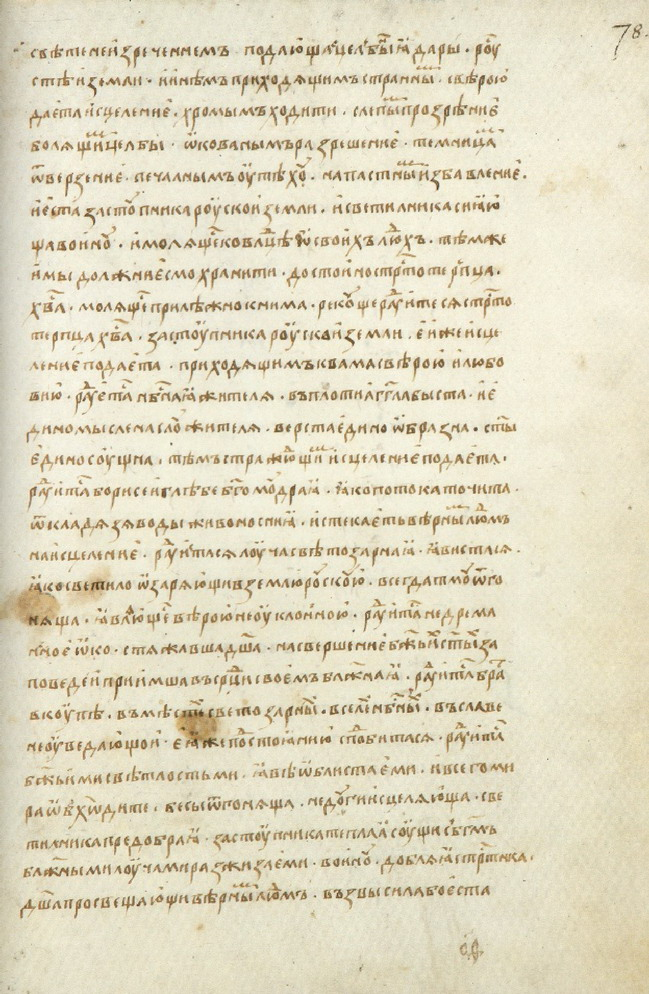
154

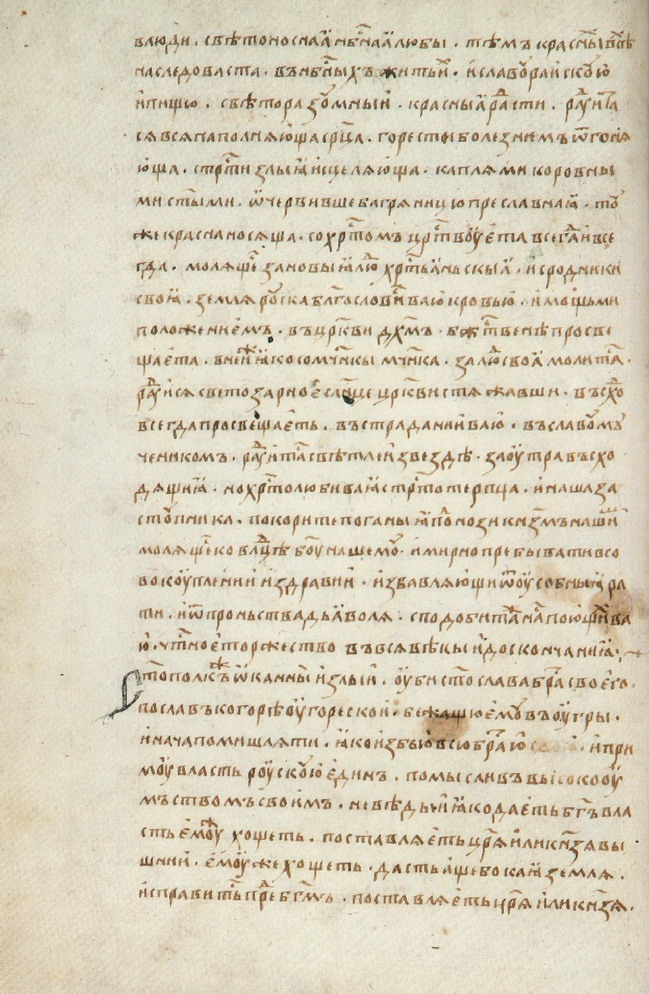
155

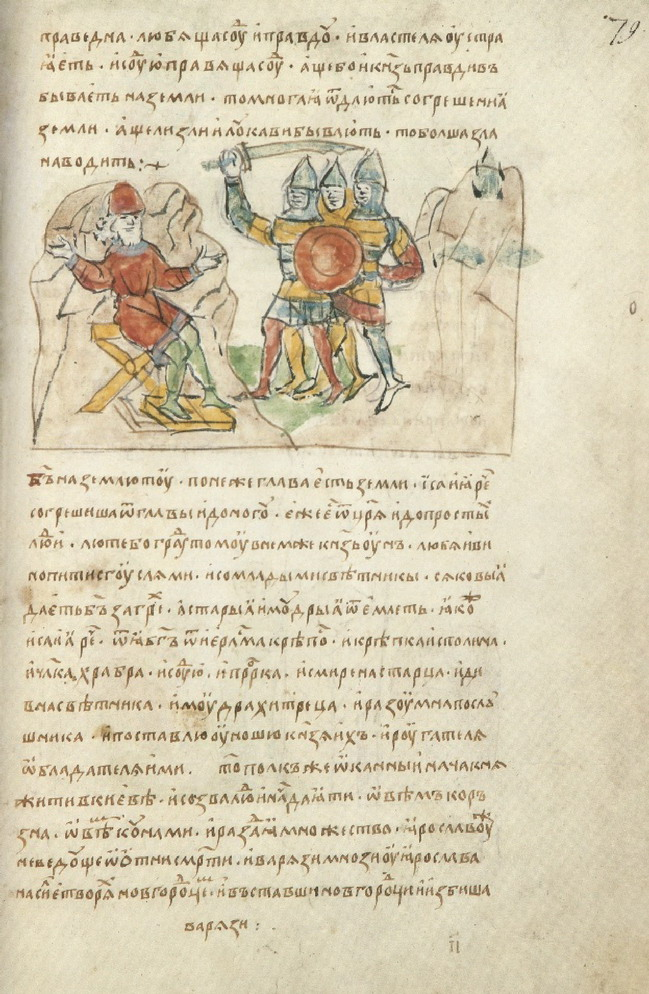
156

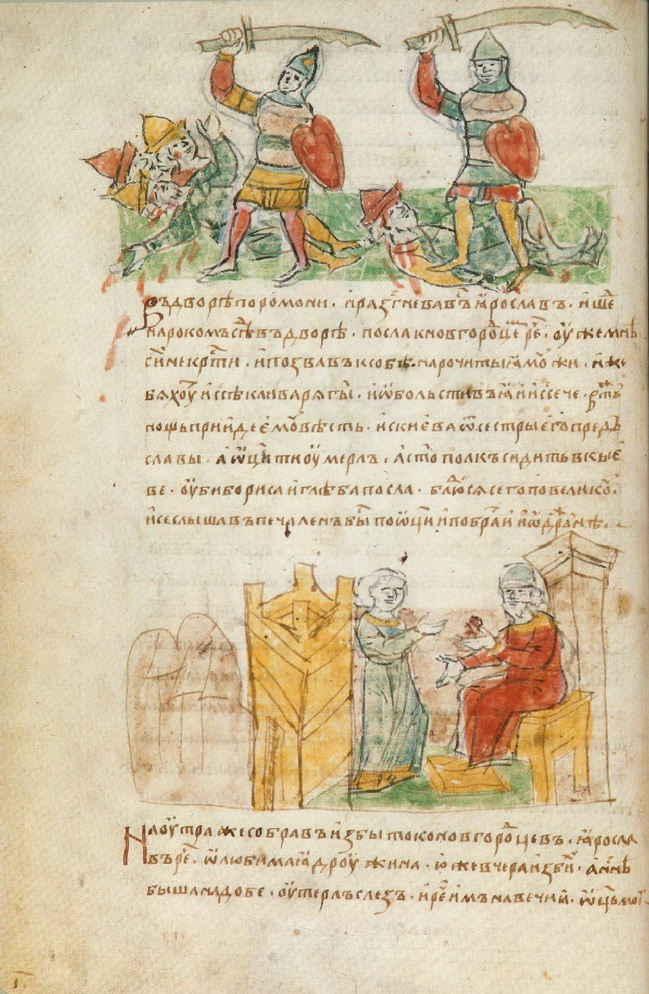
157

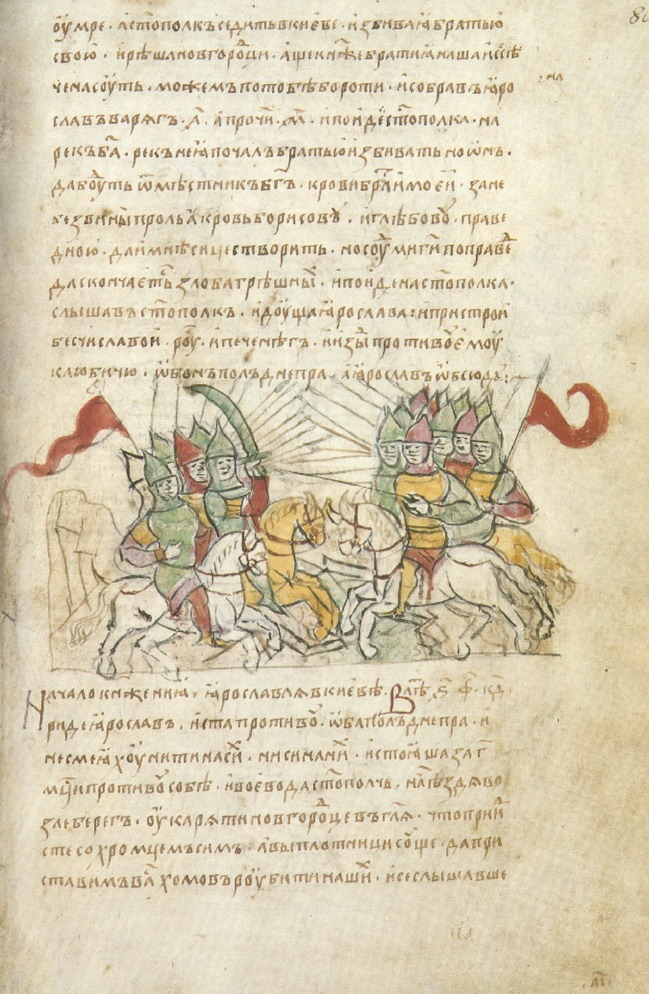
158

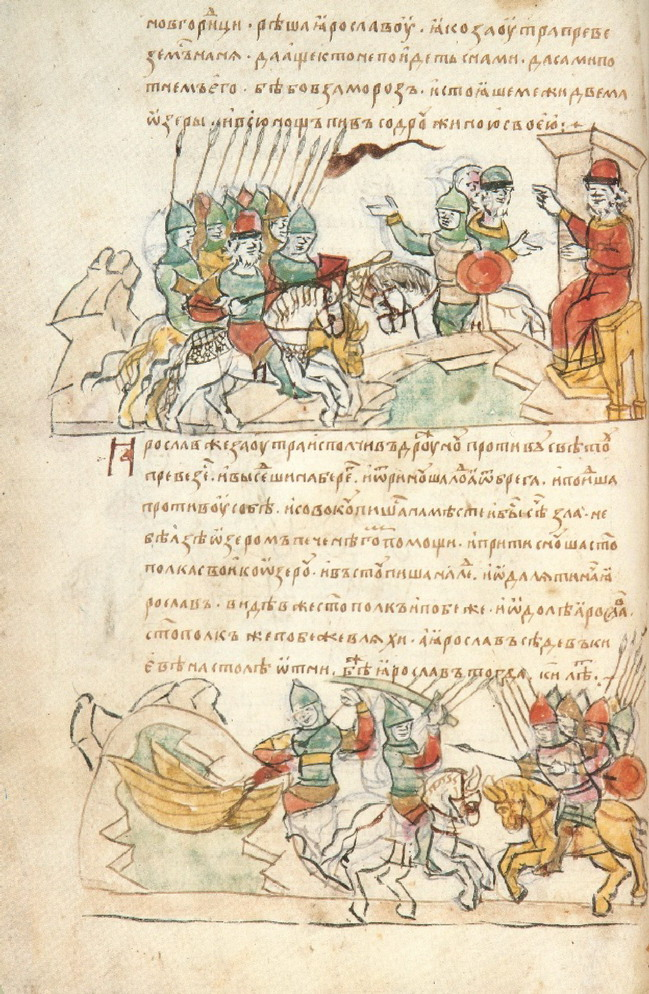
159

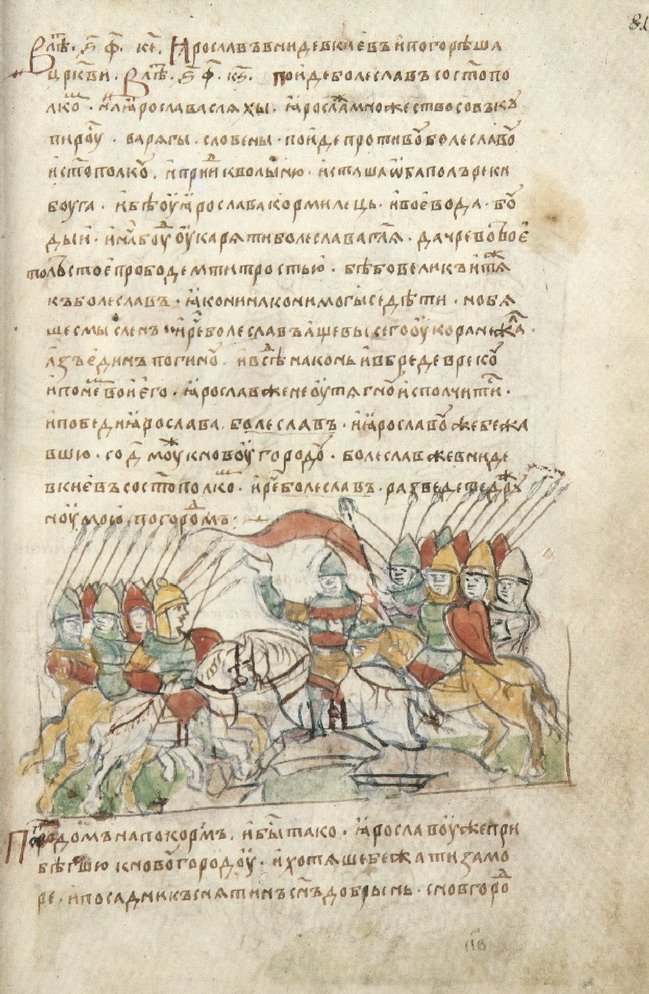
160

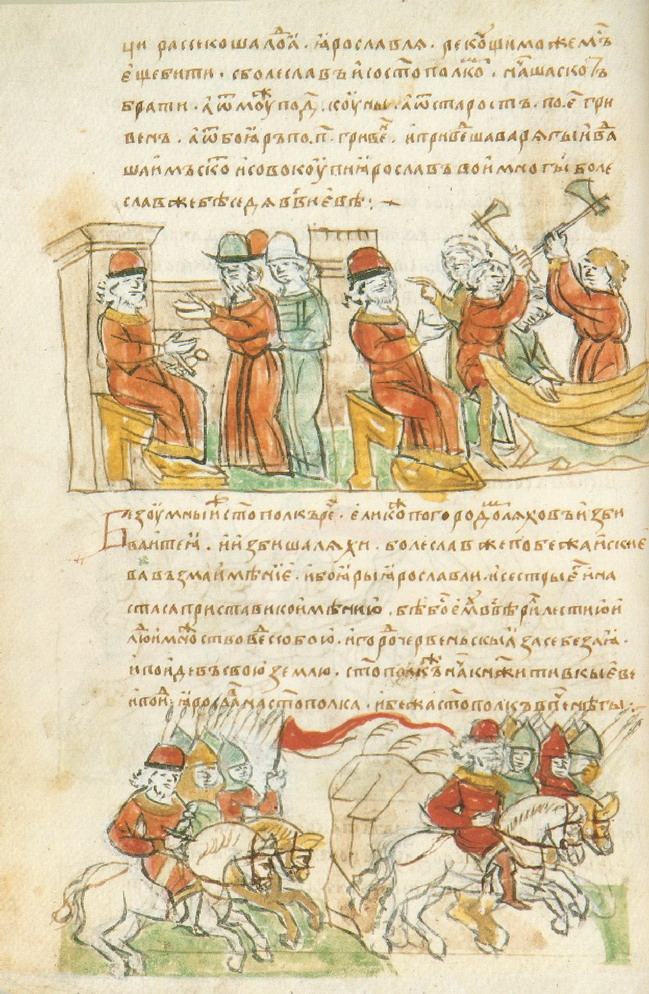
161

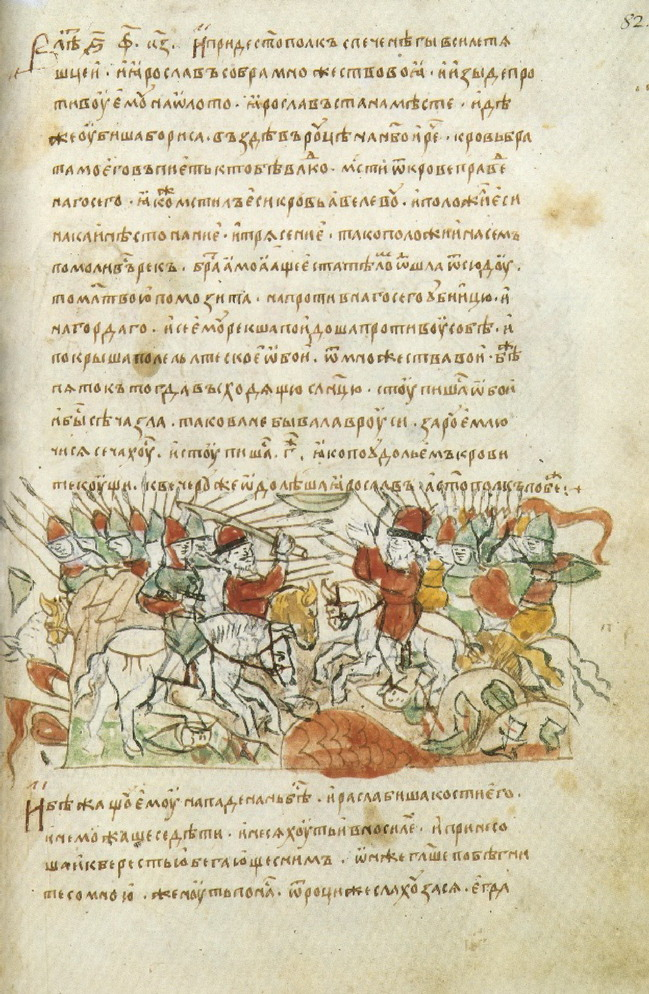
162

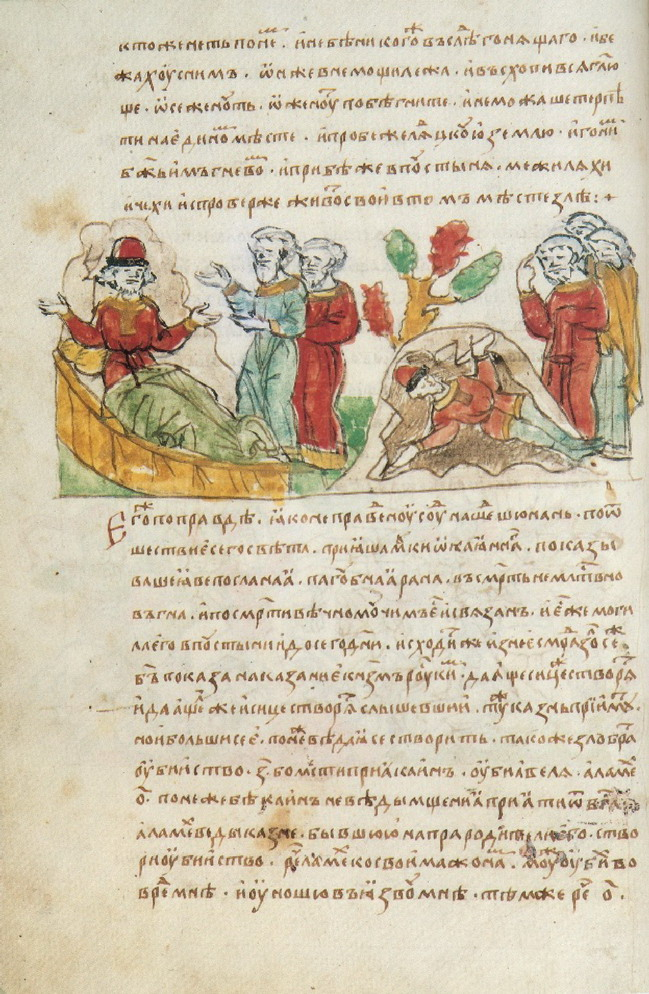
163

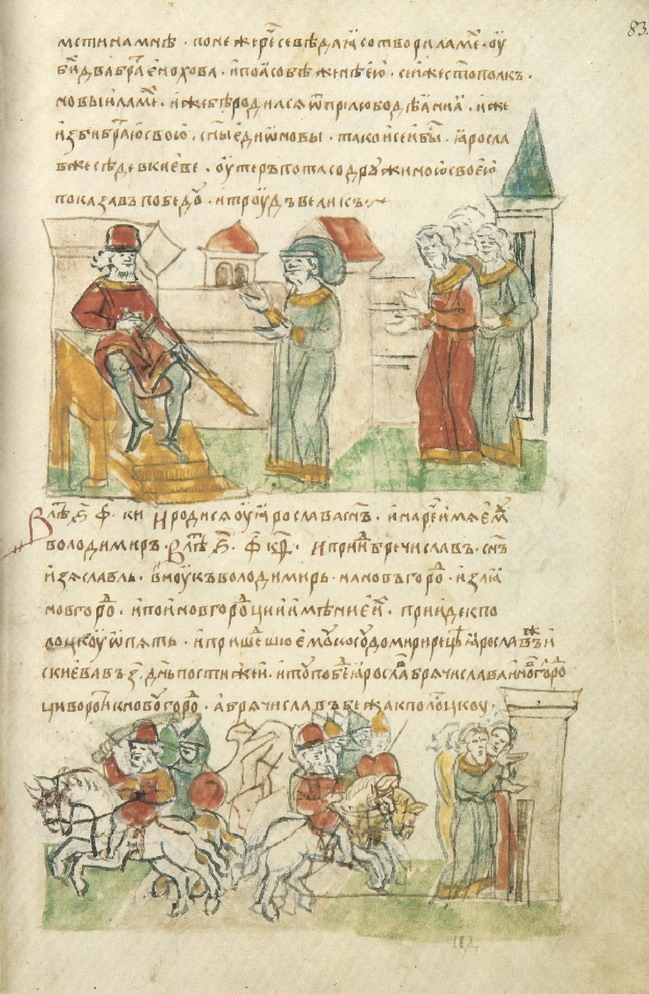
164

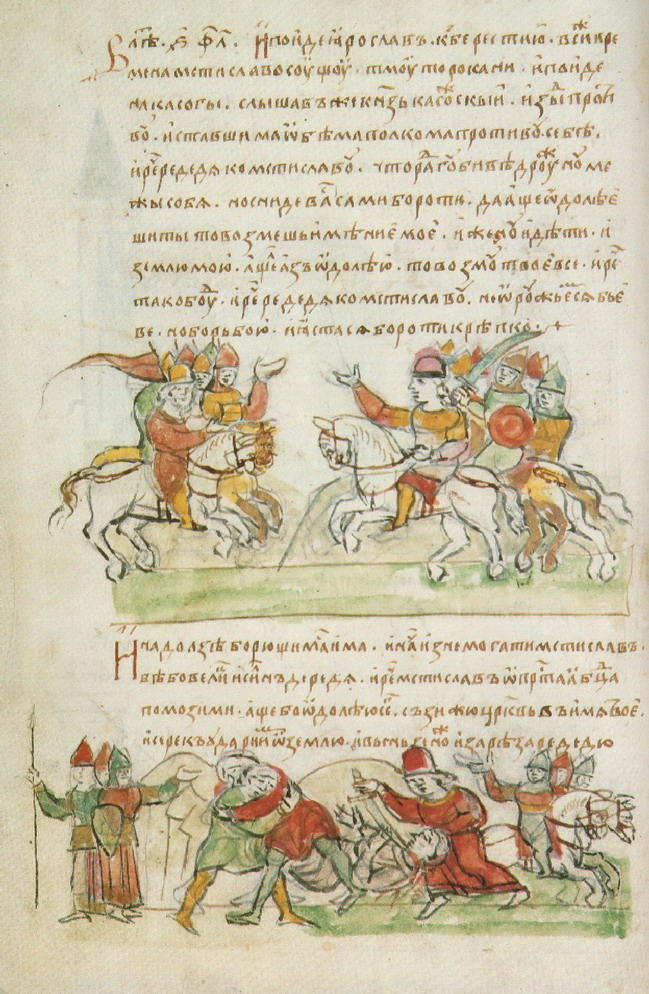
165

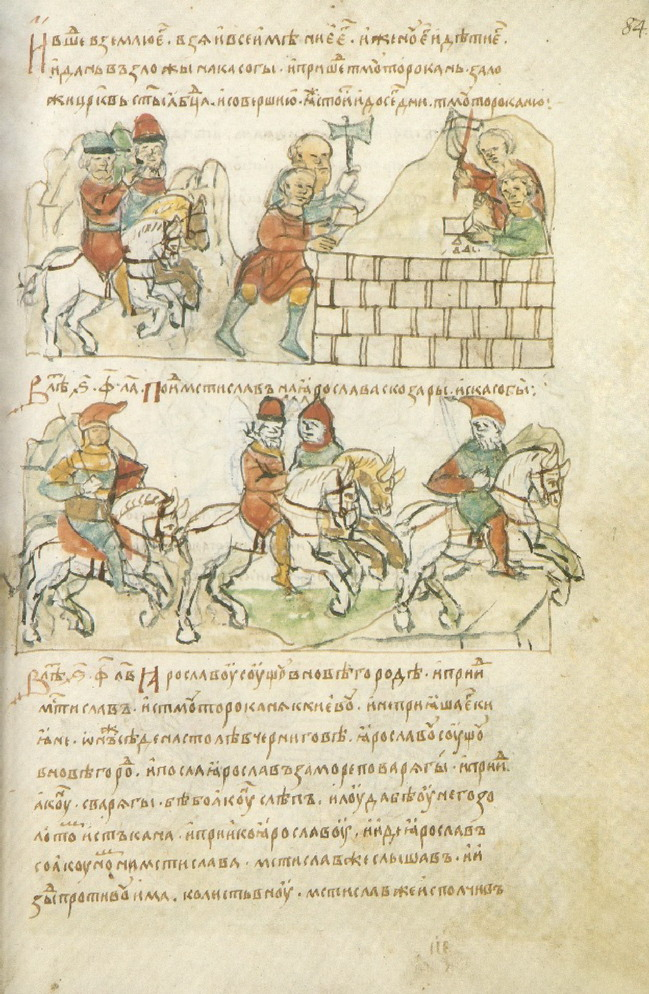
166

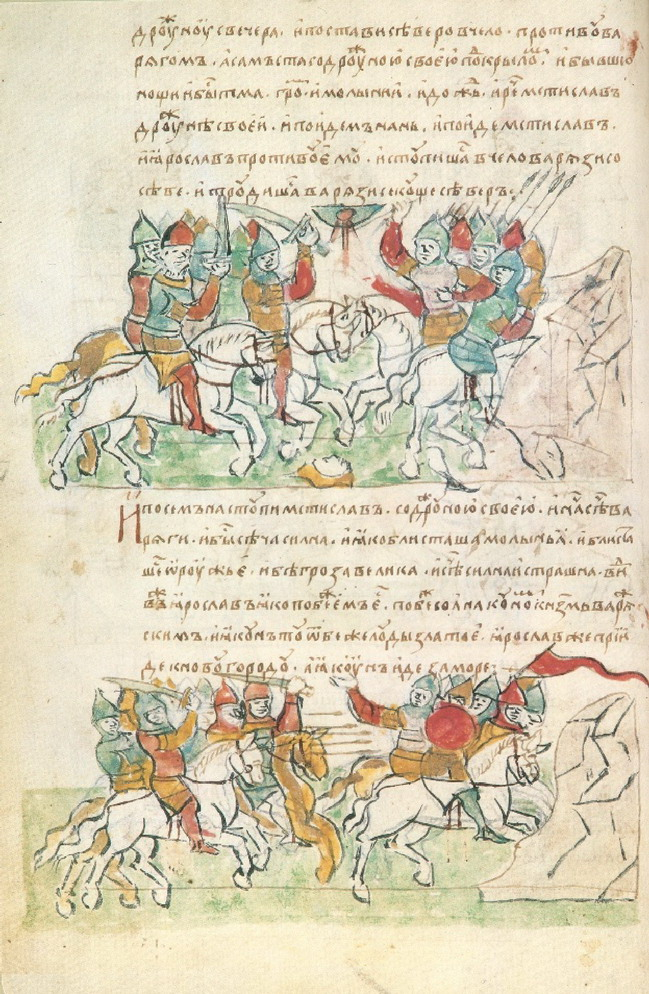
167

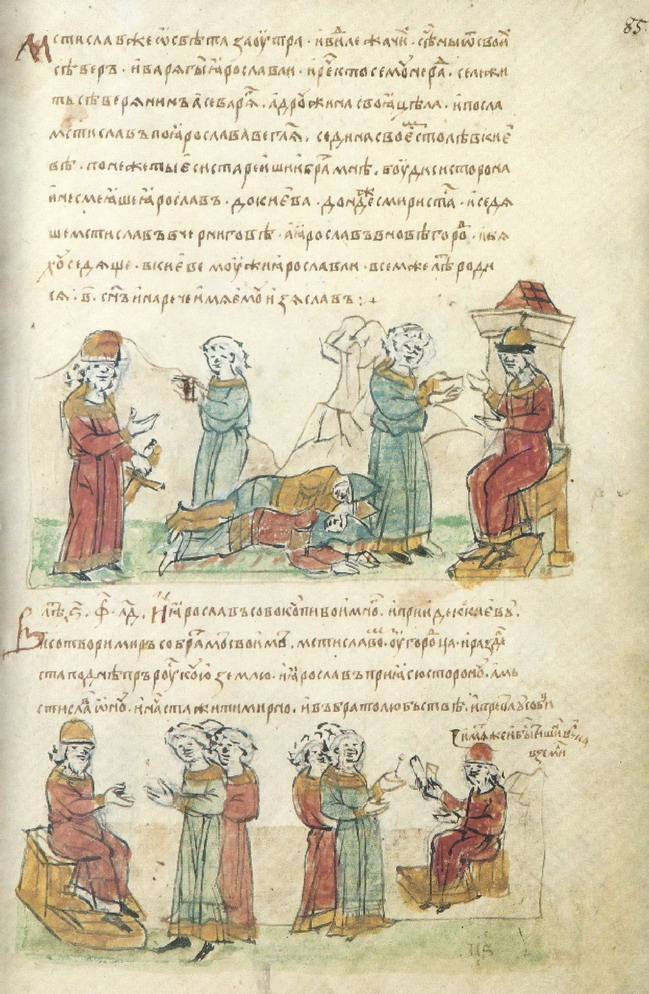
168

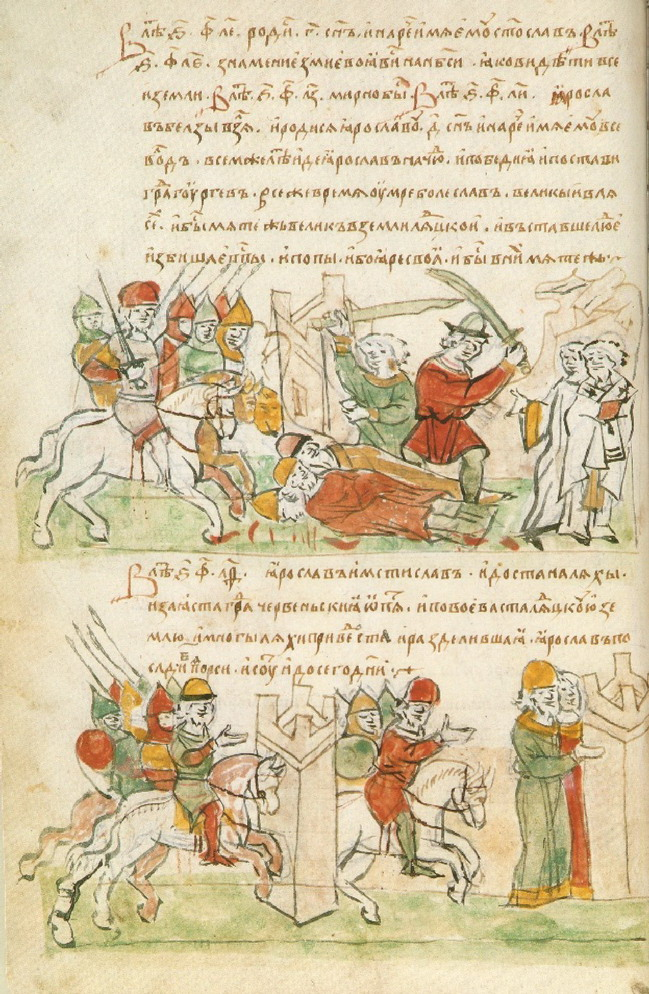
169

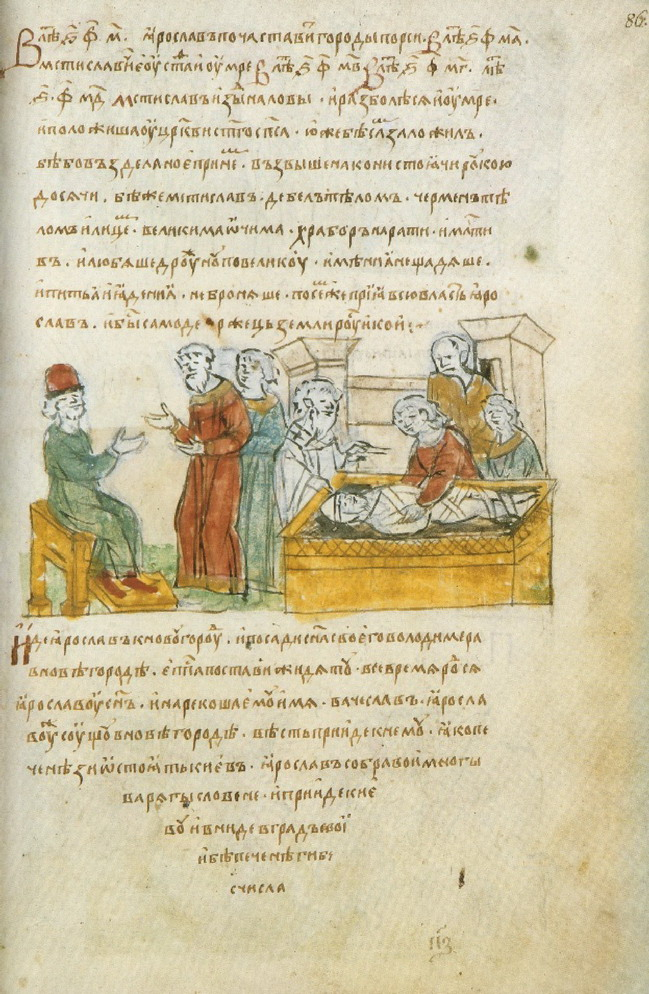
170

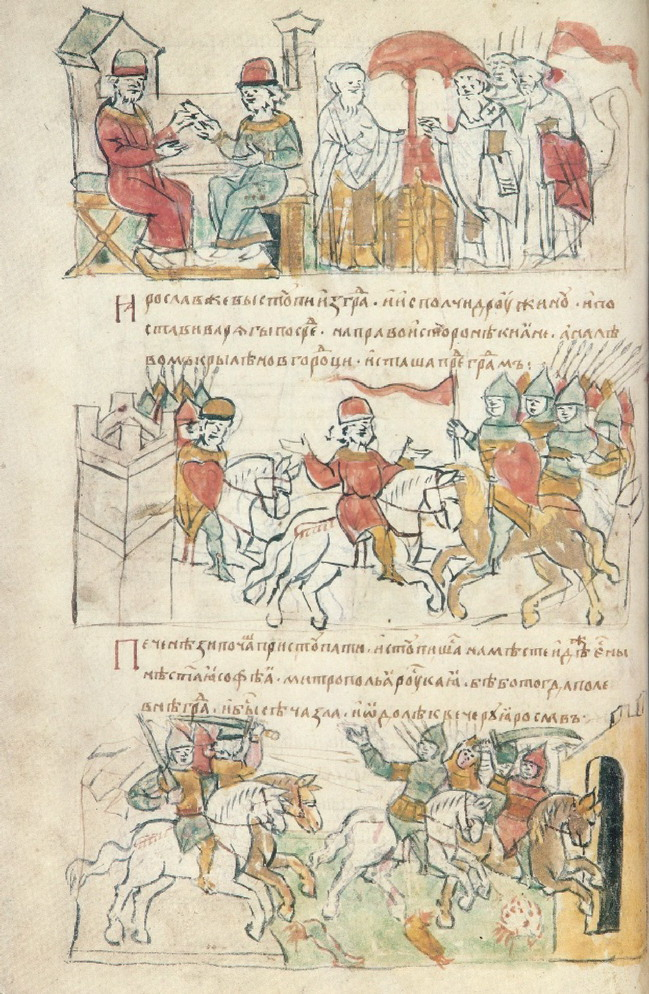
171

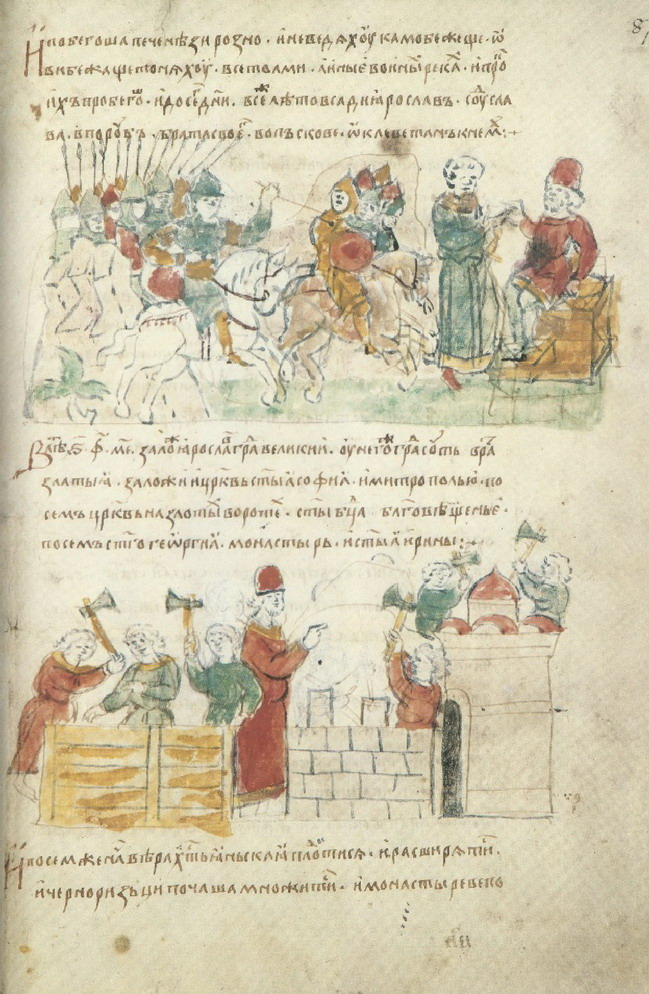
172

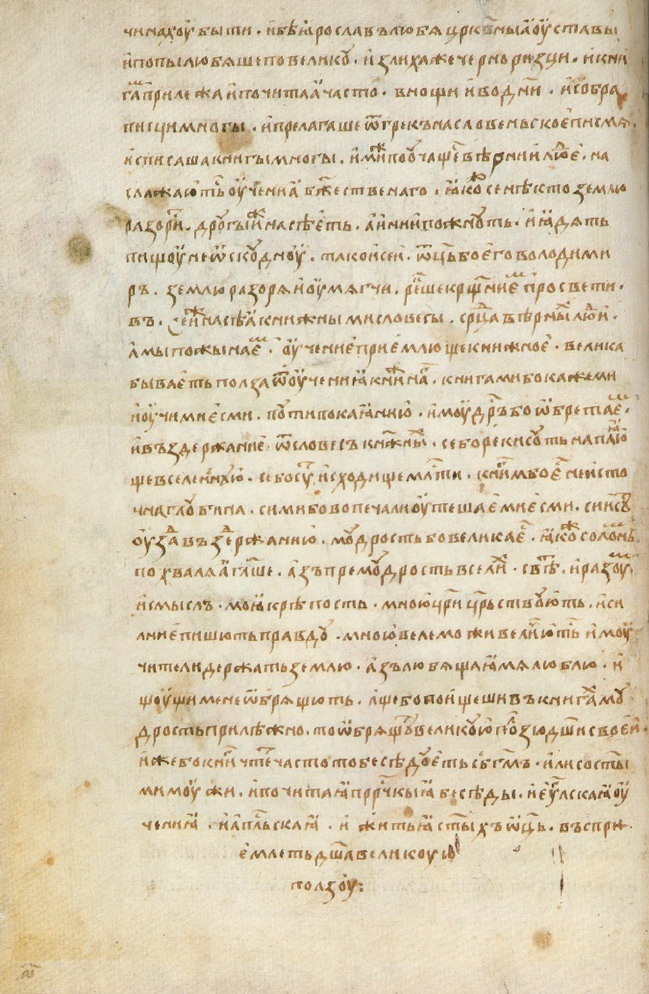
173

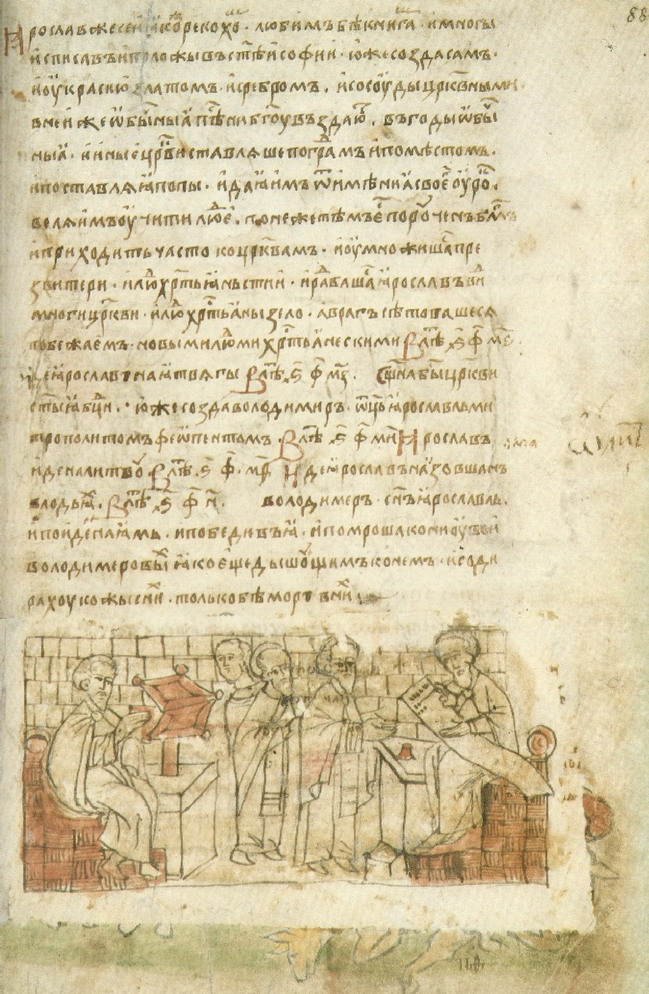
174

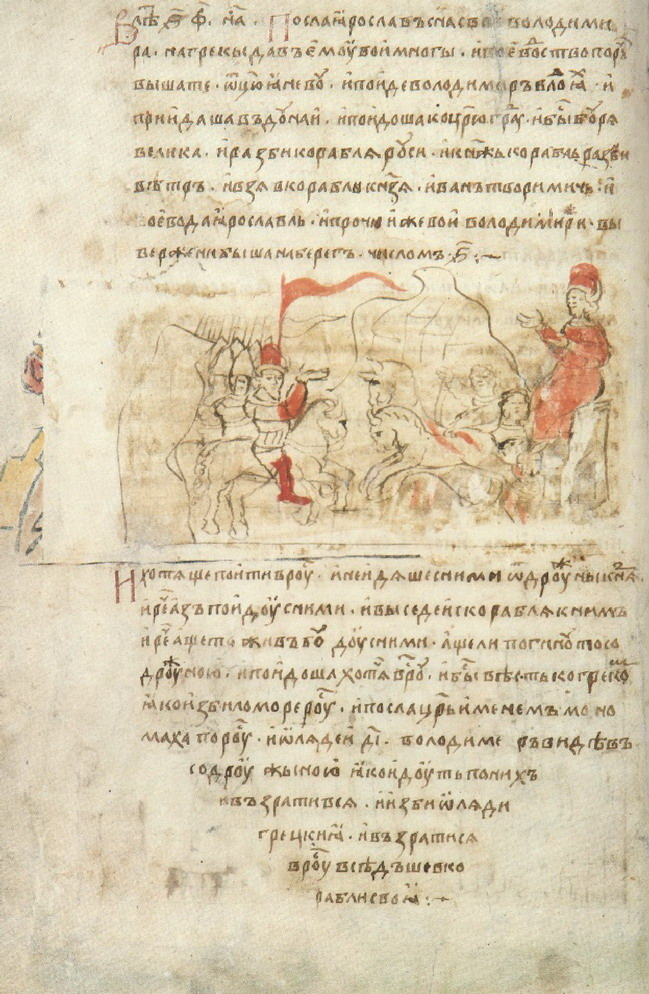
175

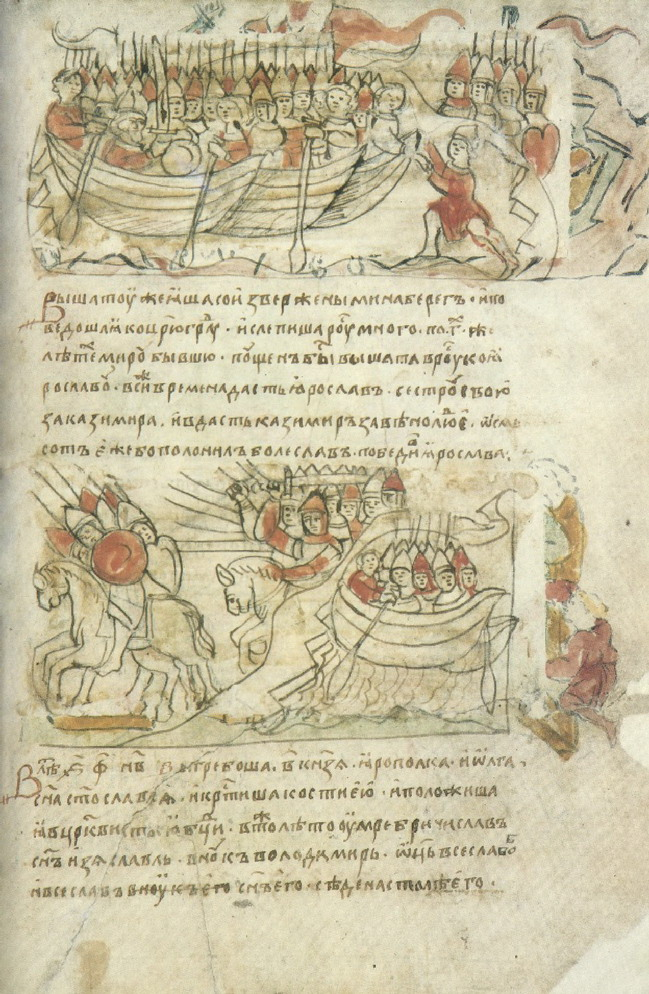
176

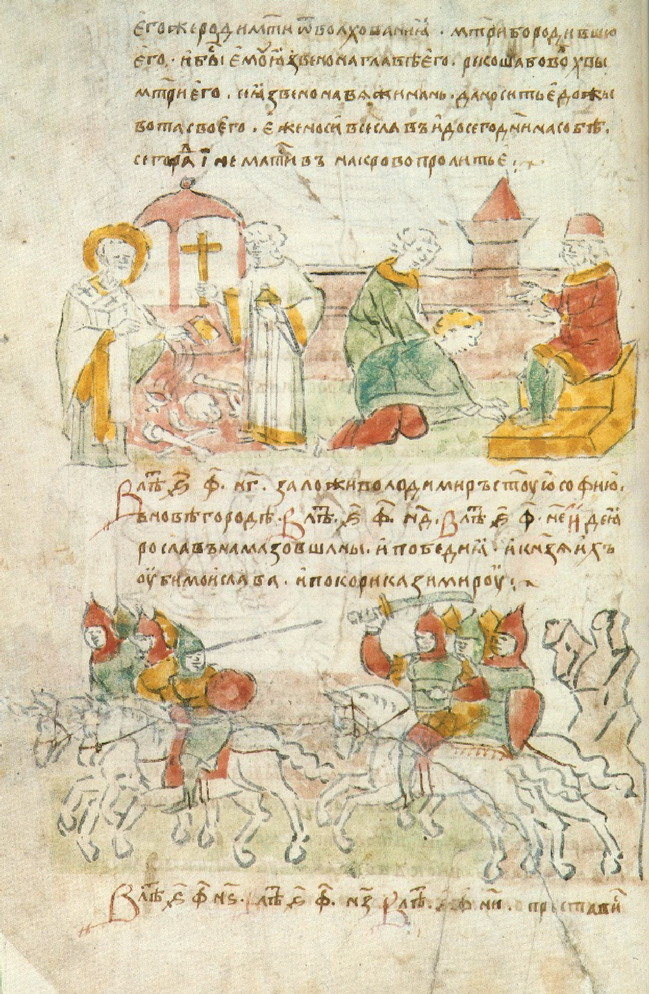
177

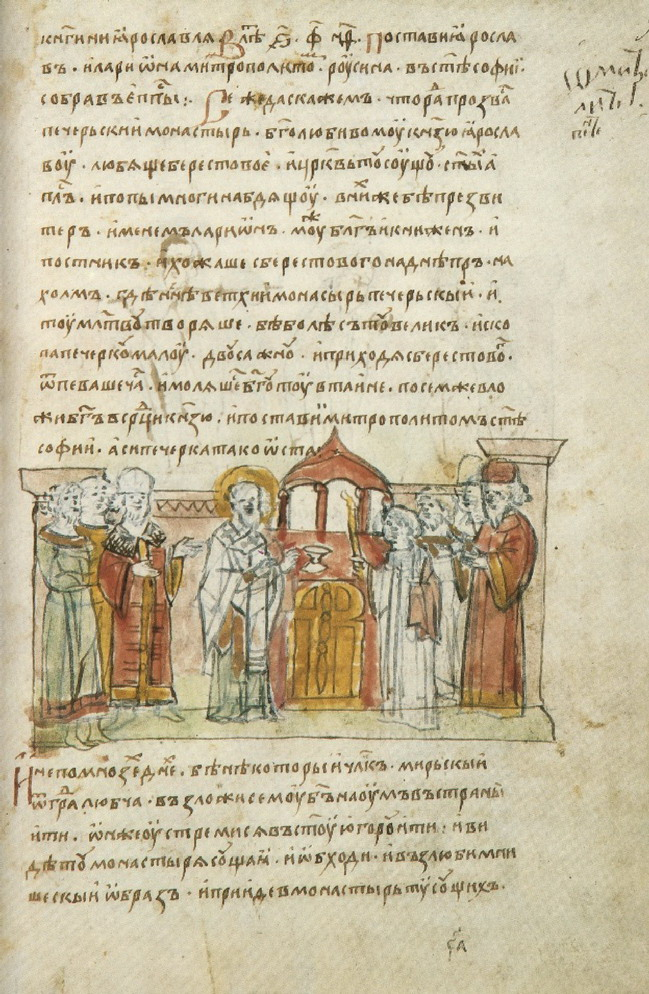
178

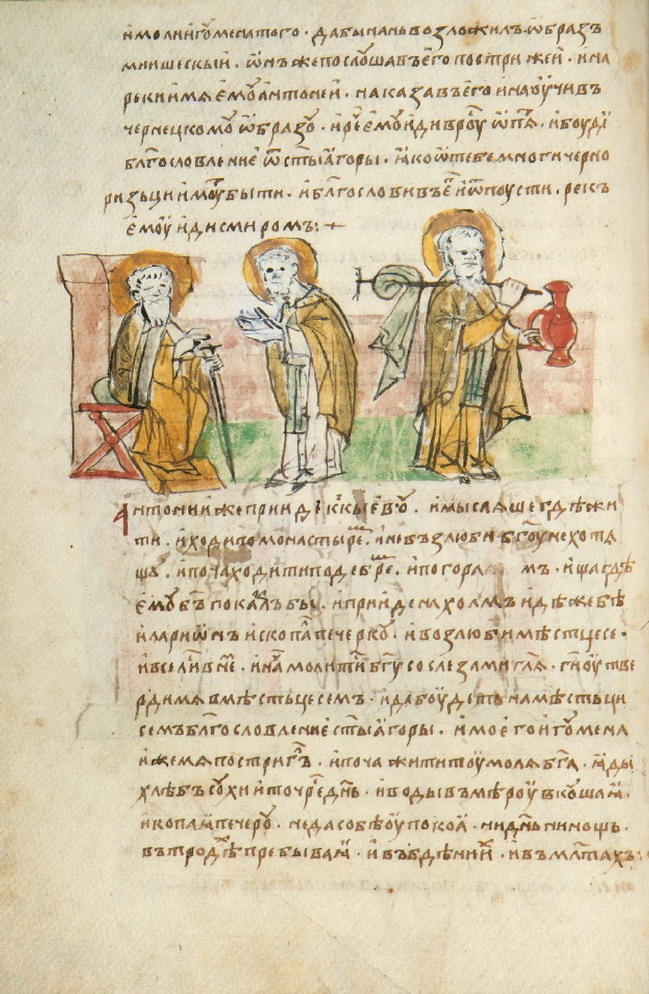
179

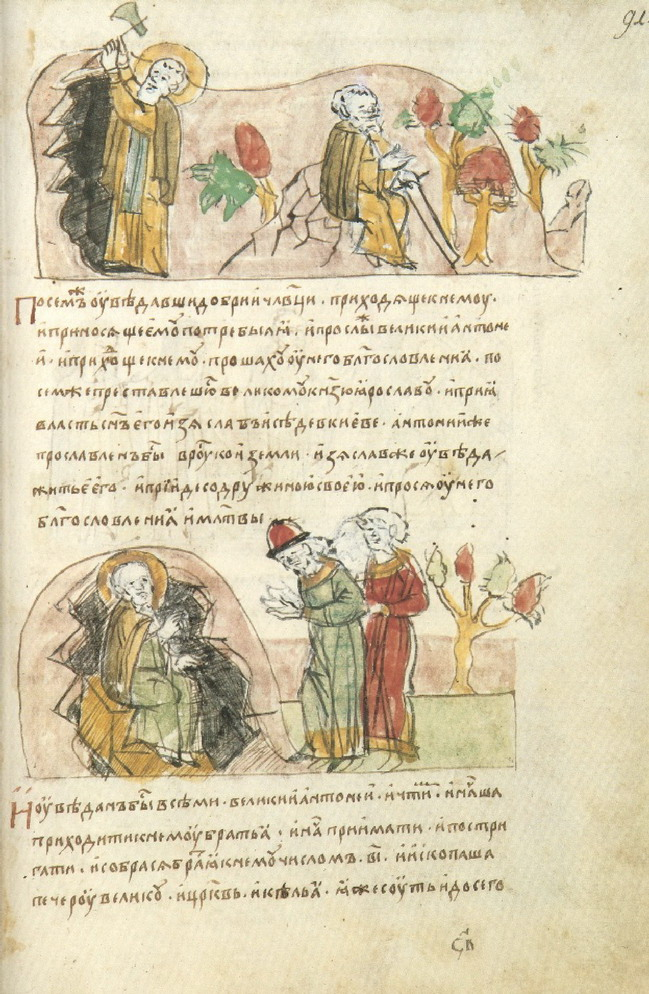
180

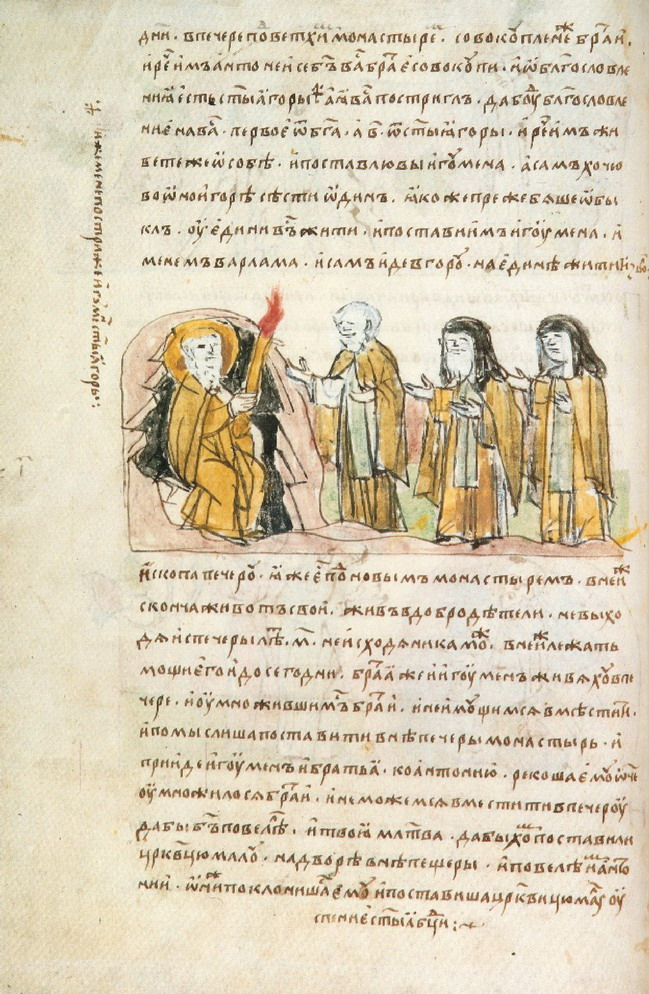
181

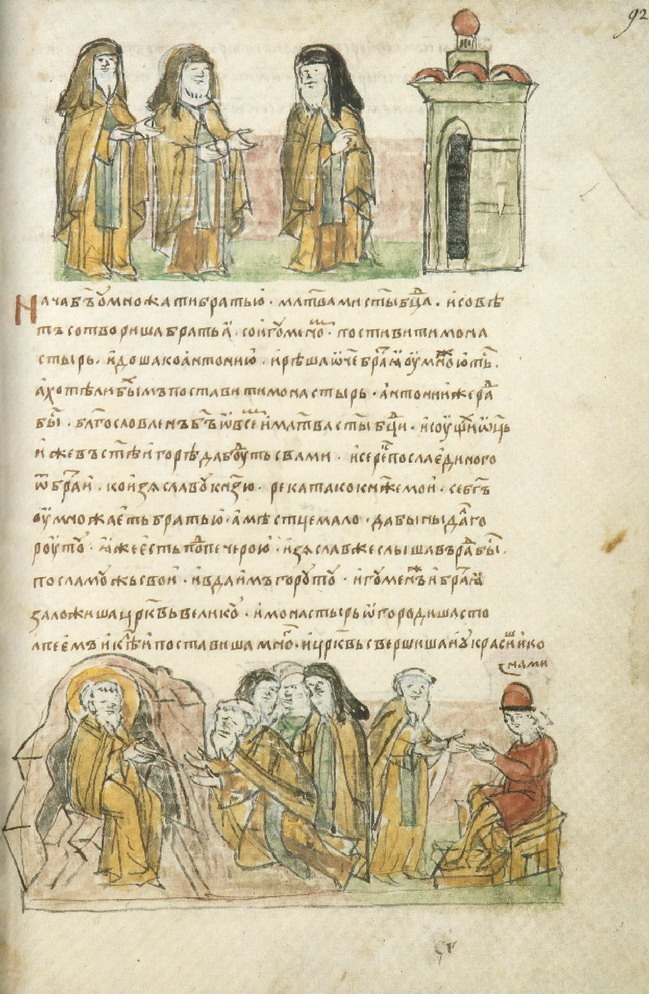
182

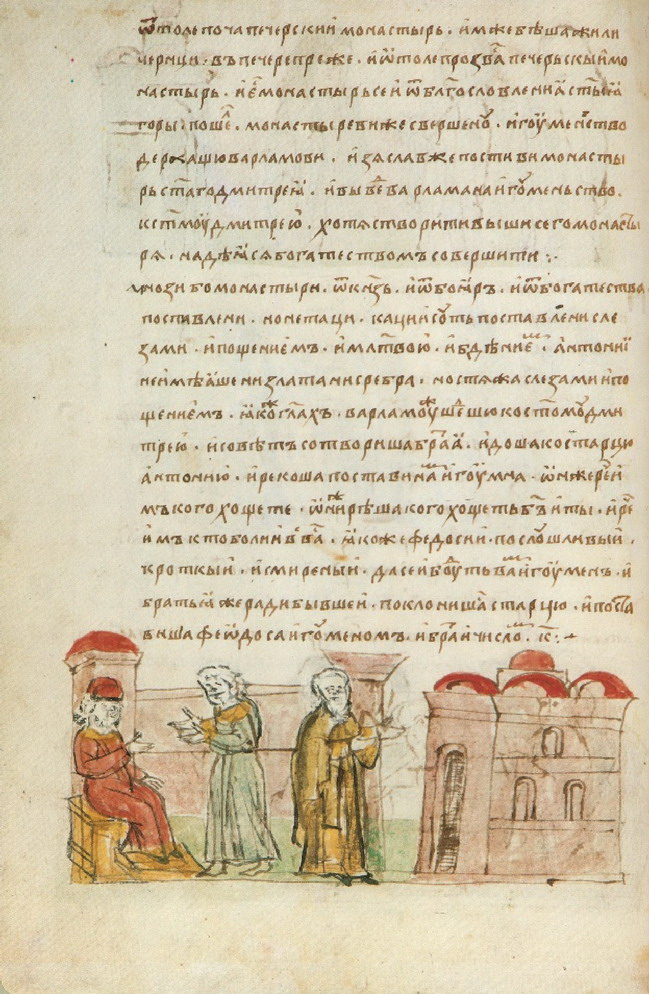
183

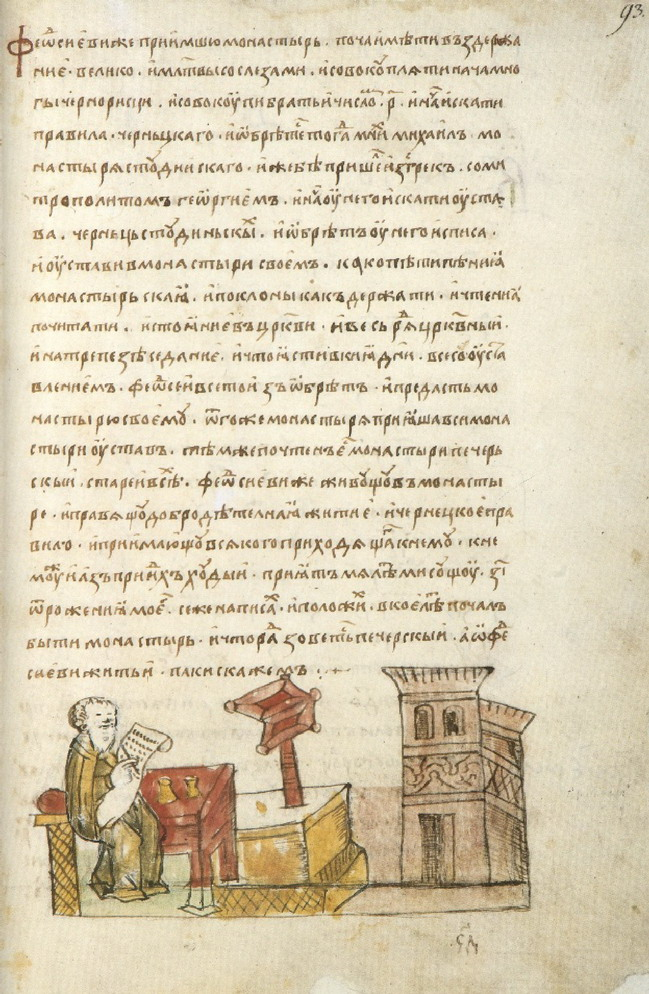
184

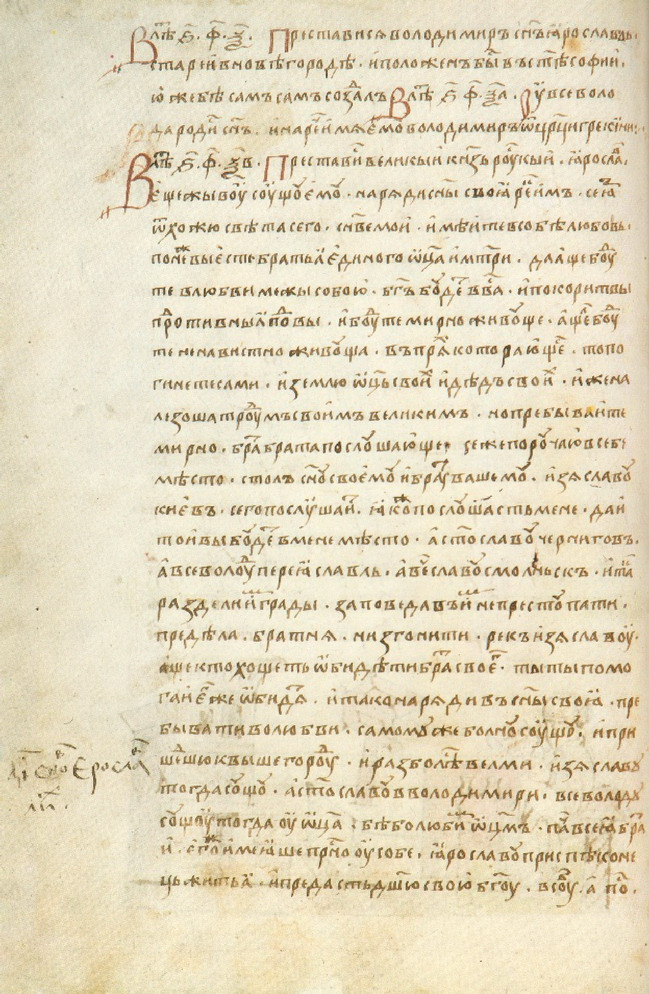
185

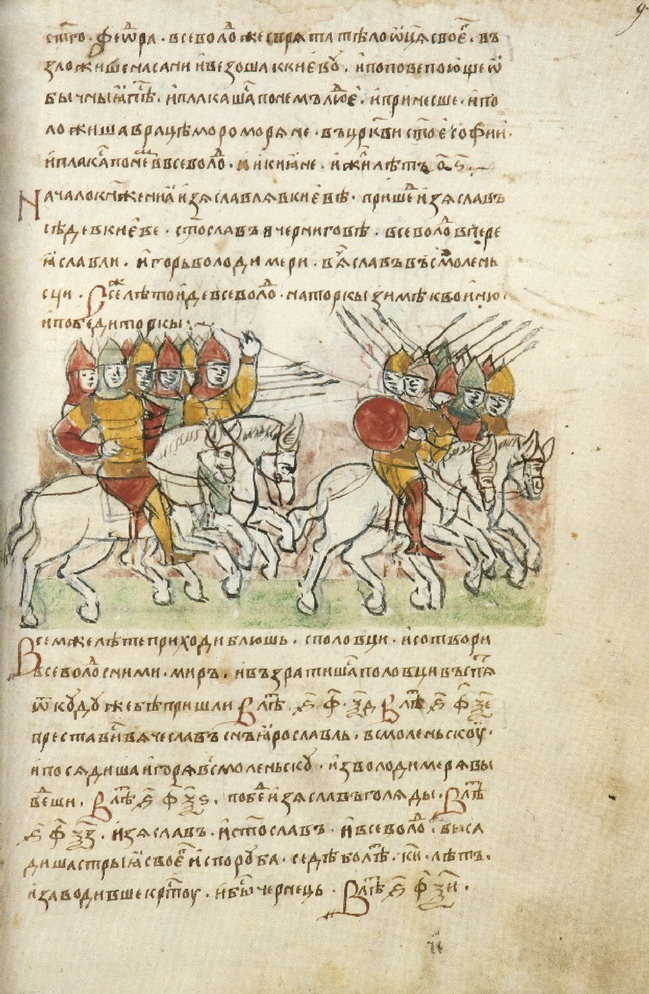
186

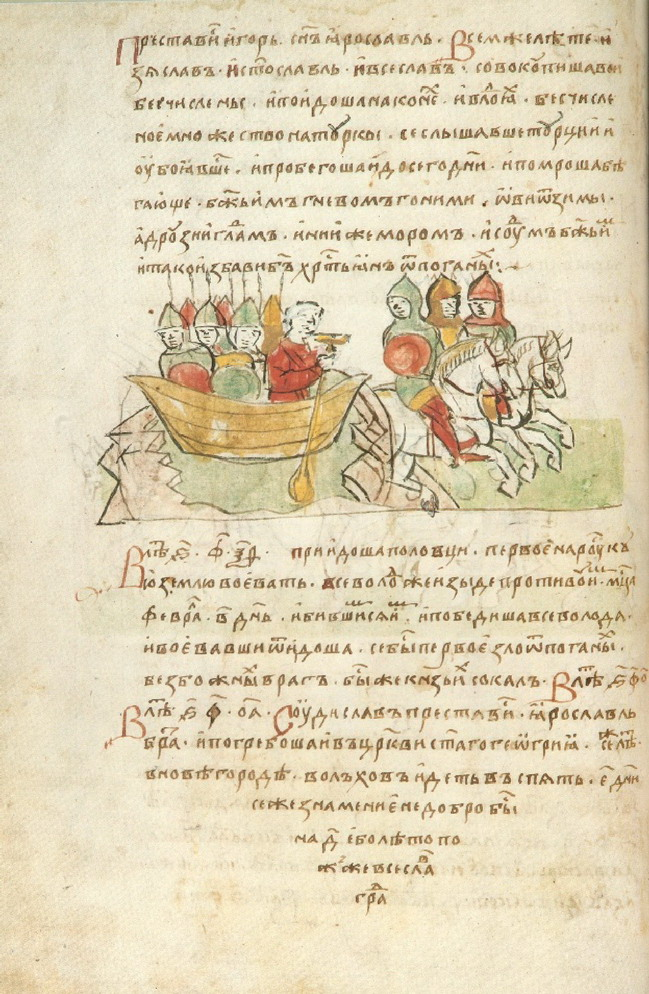
187

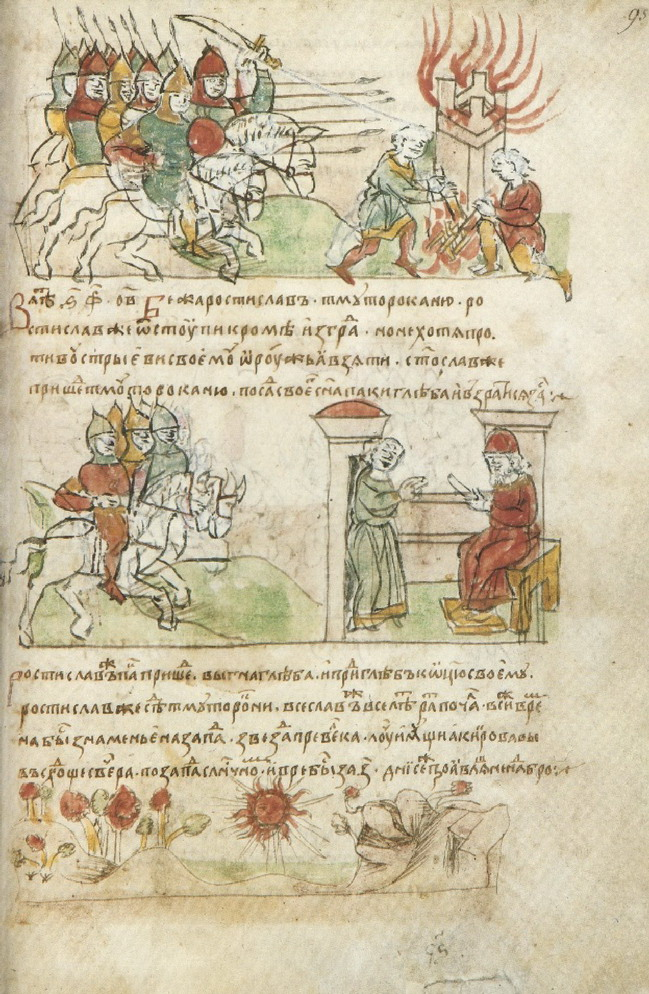
188

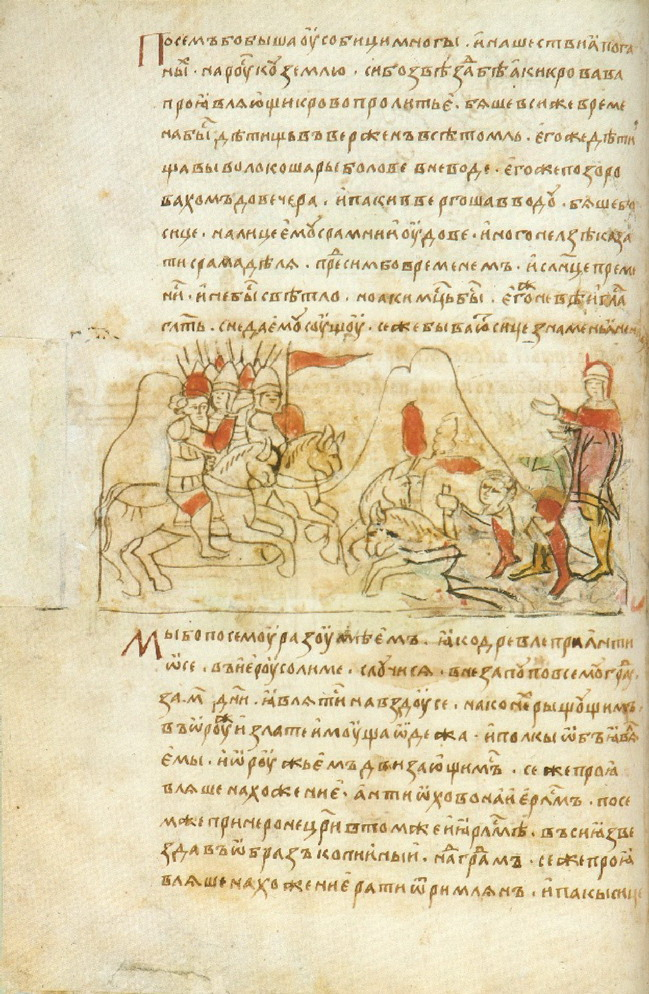
189

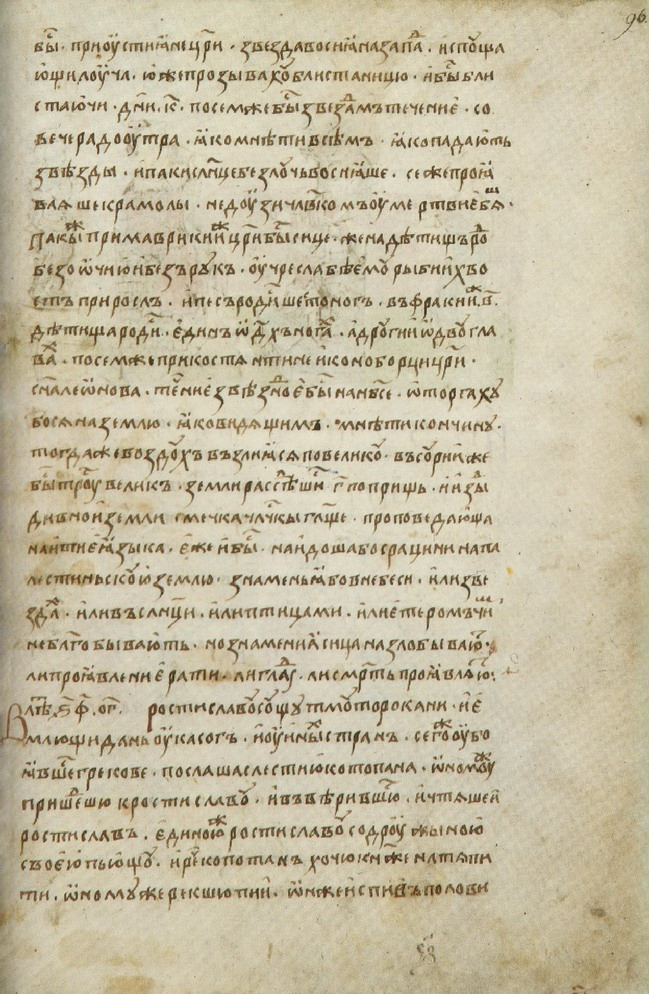
190

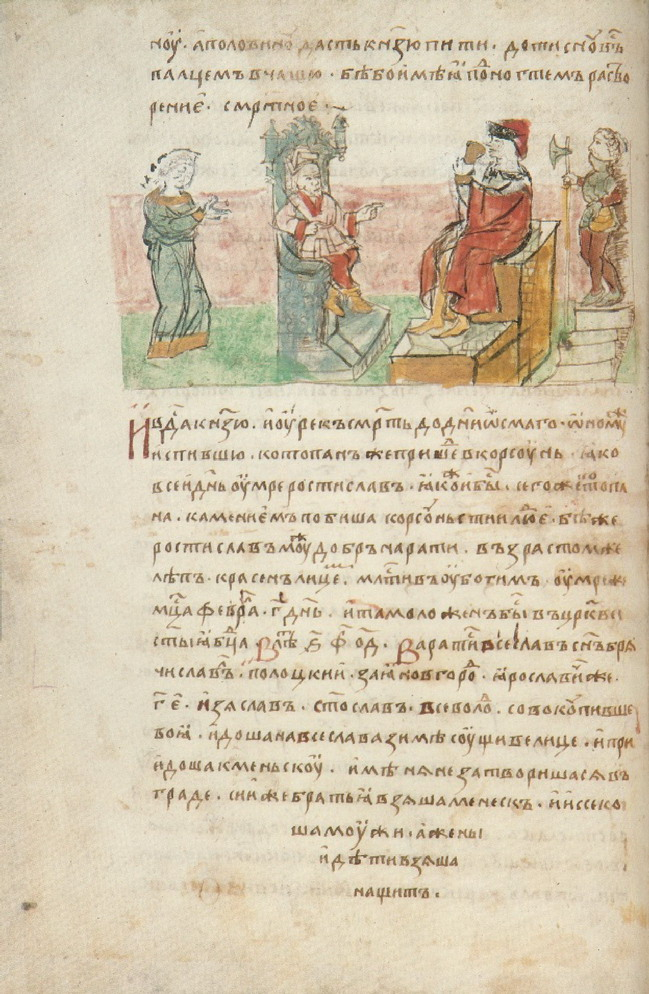
191

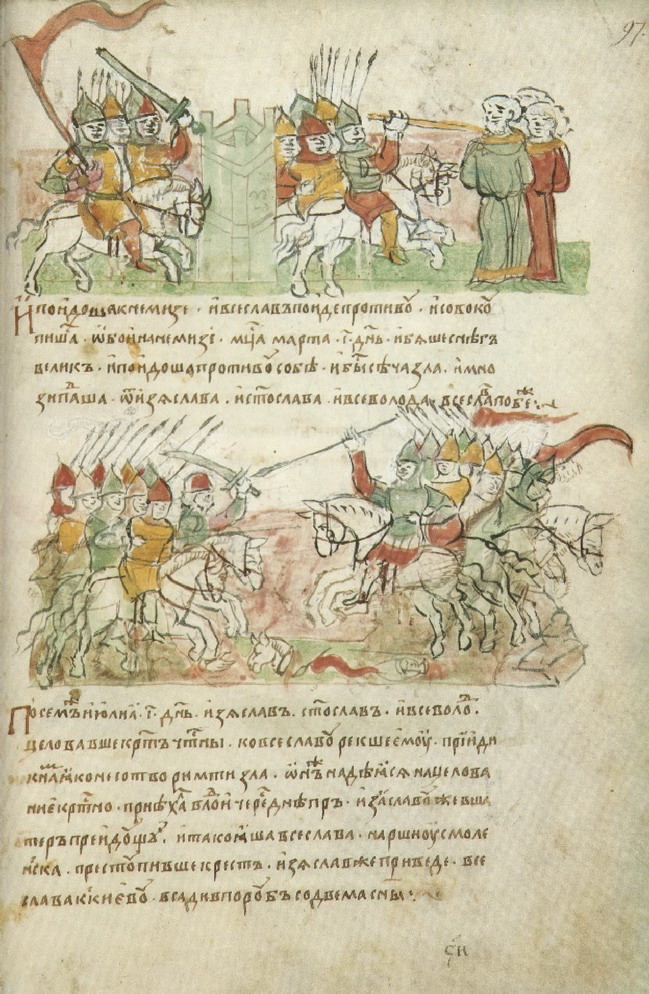
192

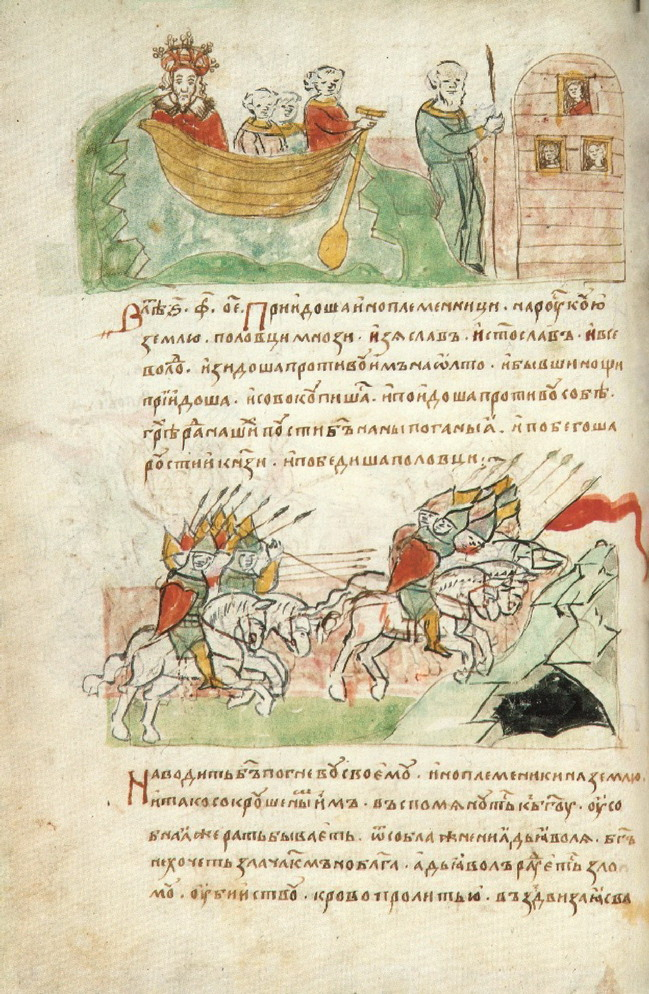
193

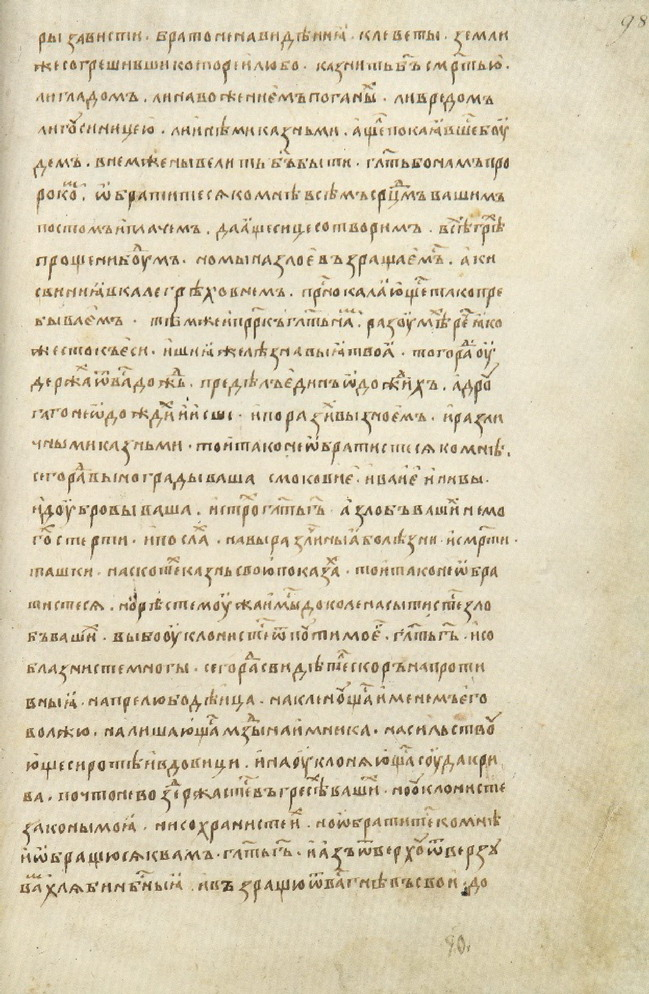
194

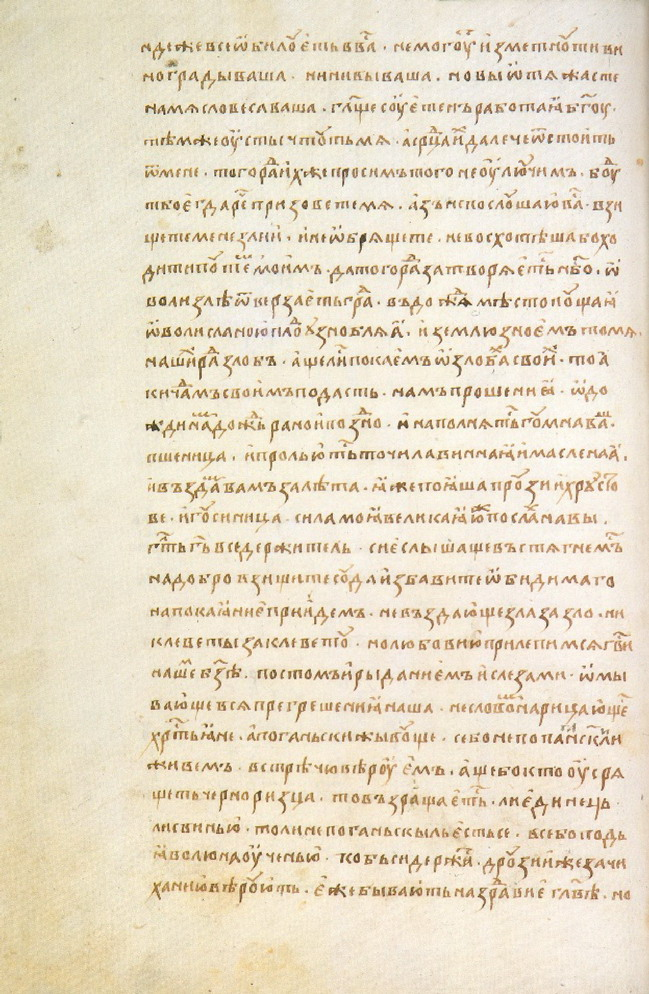
195

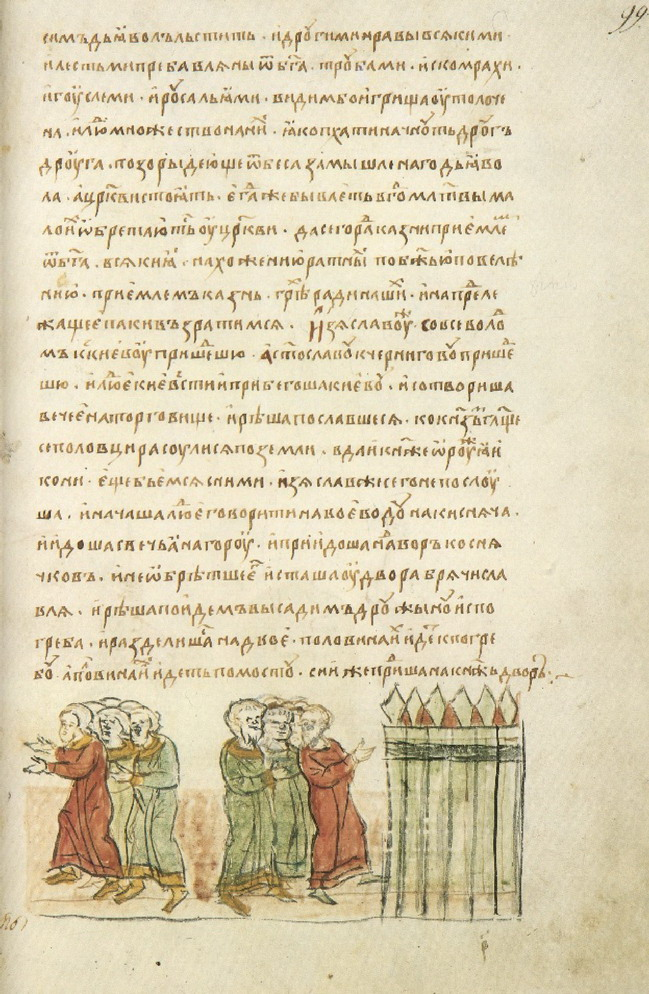
196

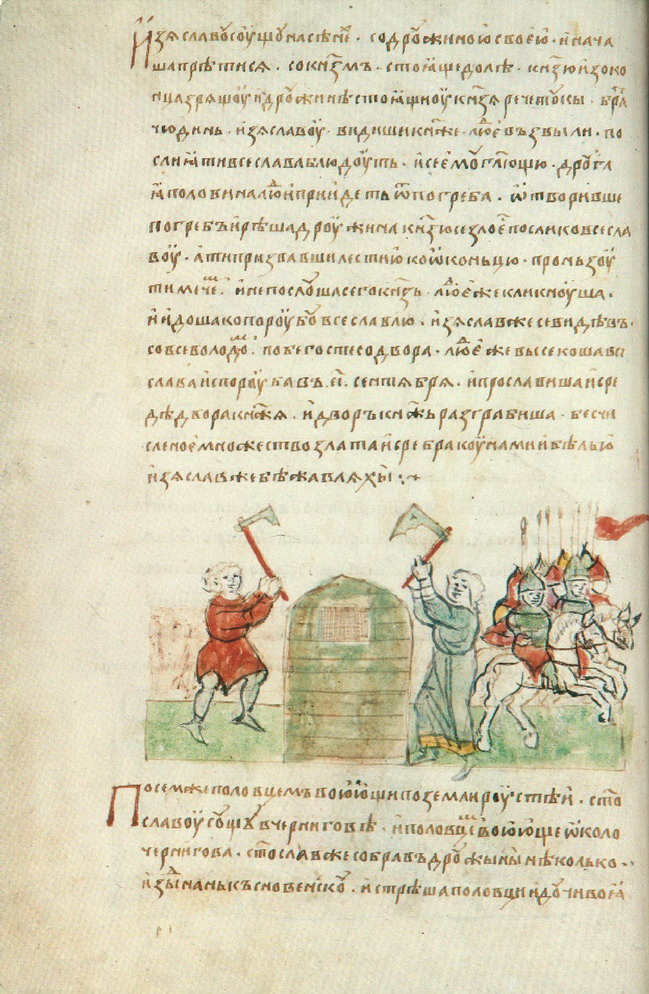
197

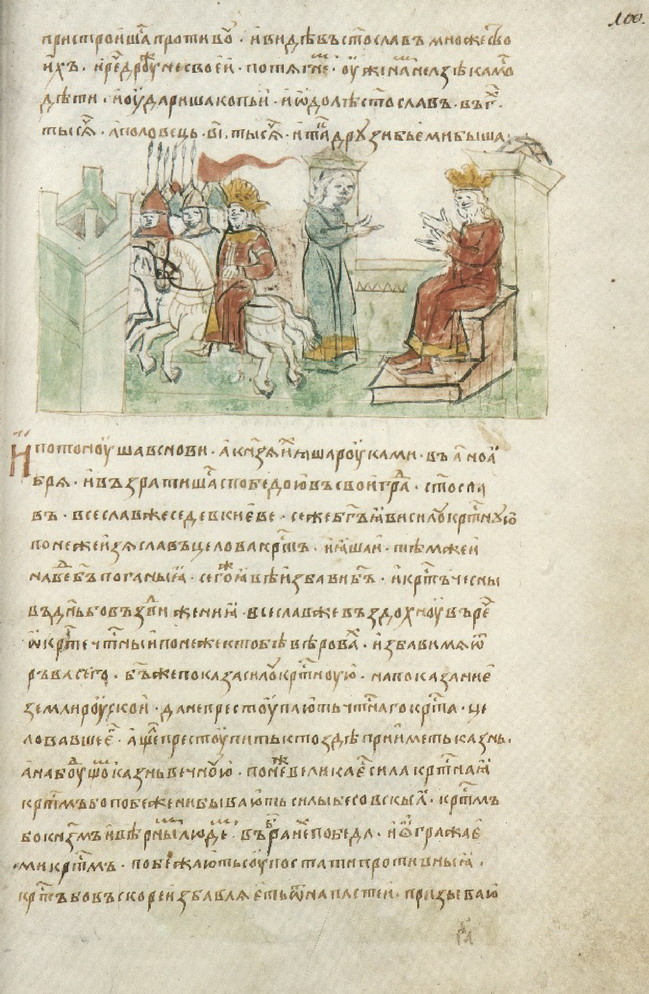
198

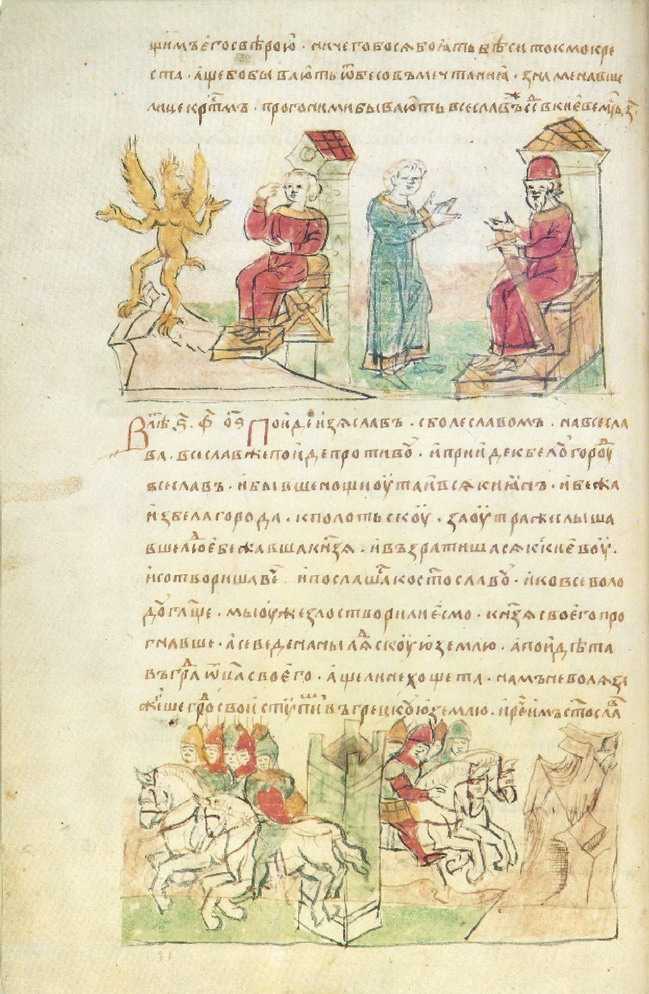
199

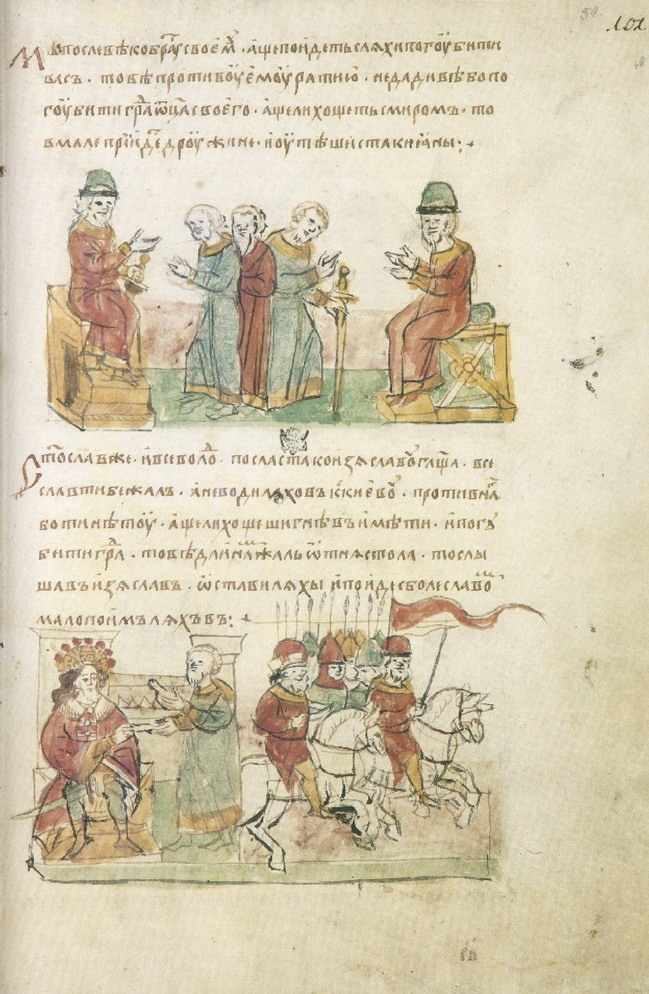
200

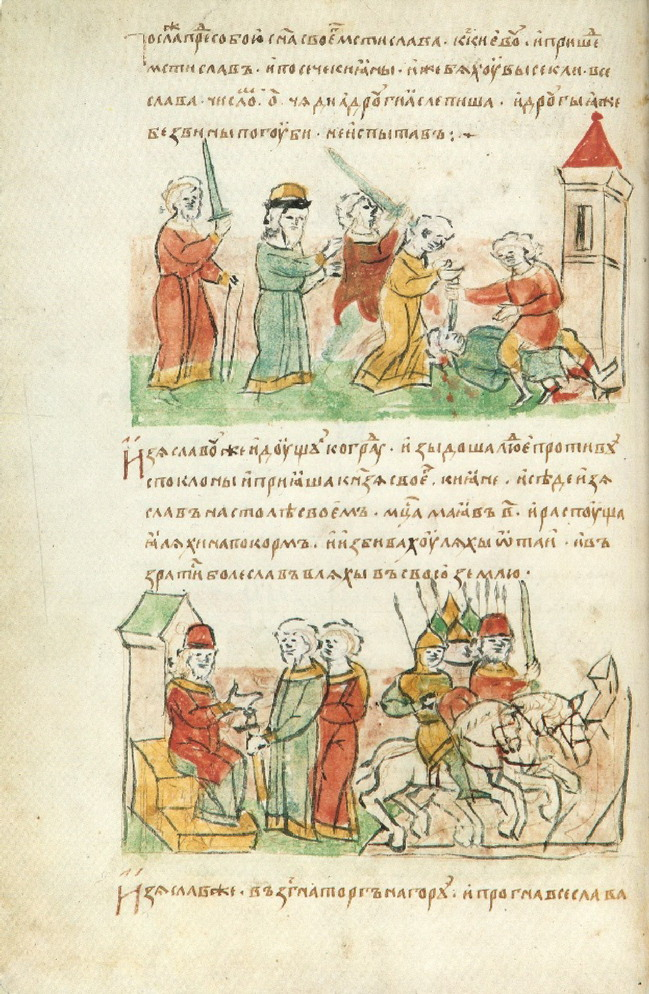
201

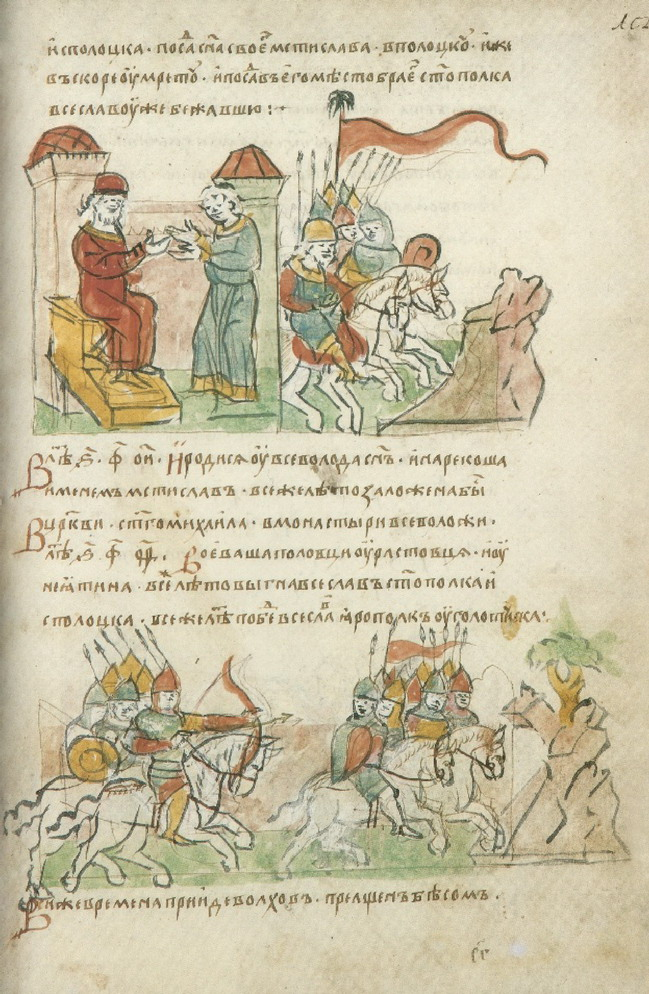
202

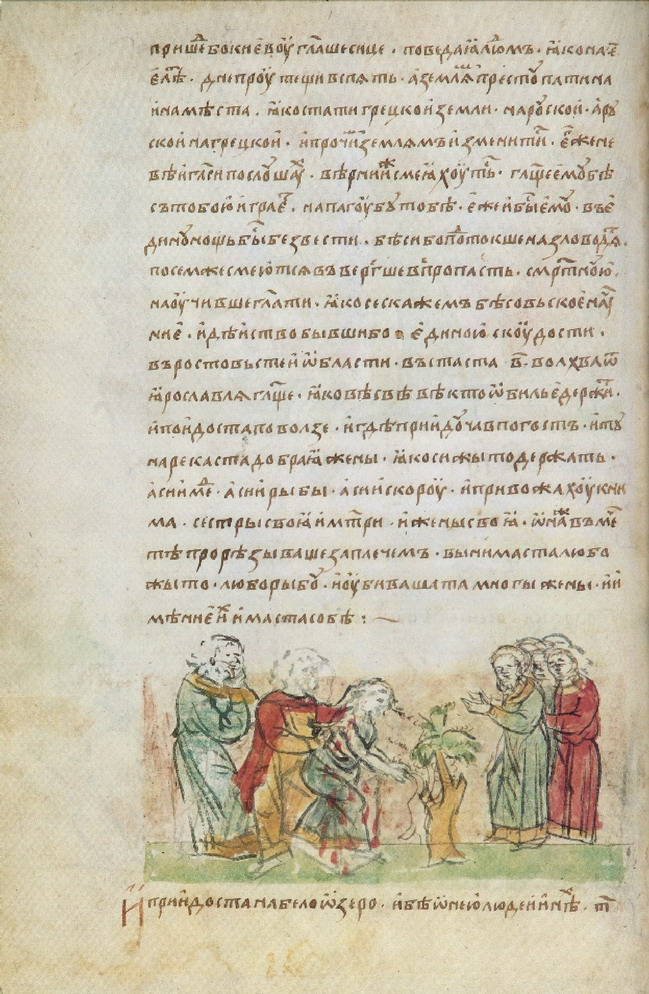
203

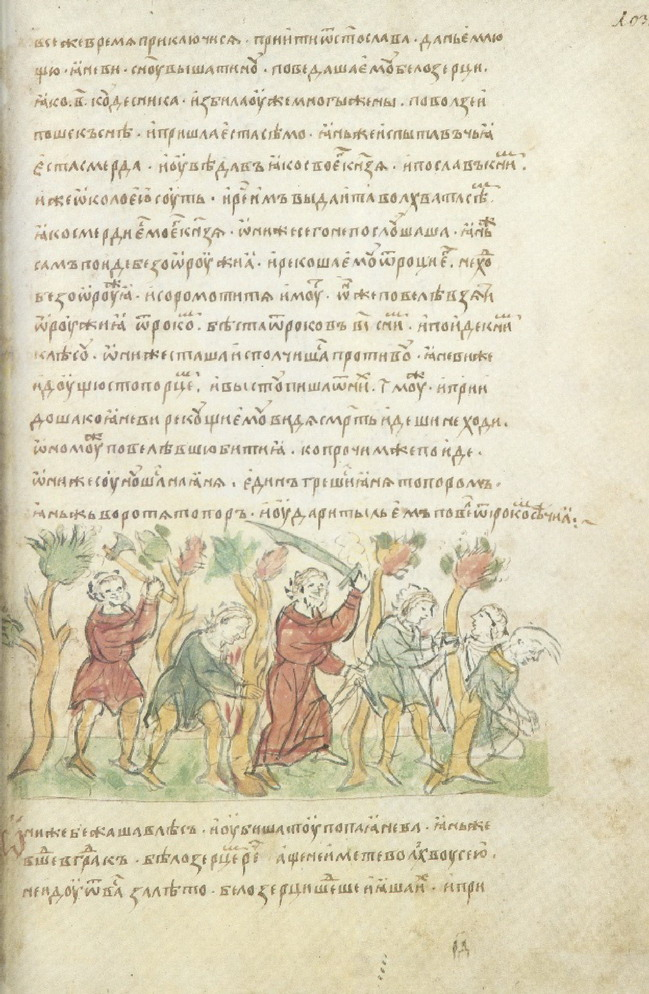
204

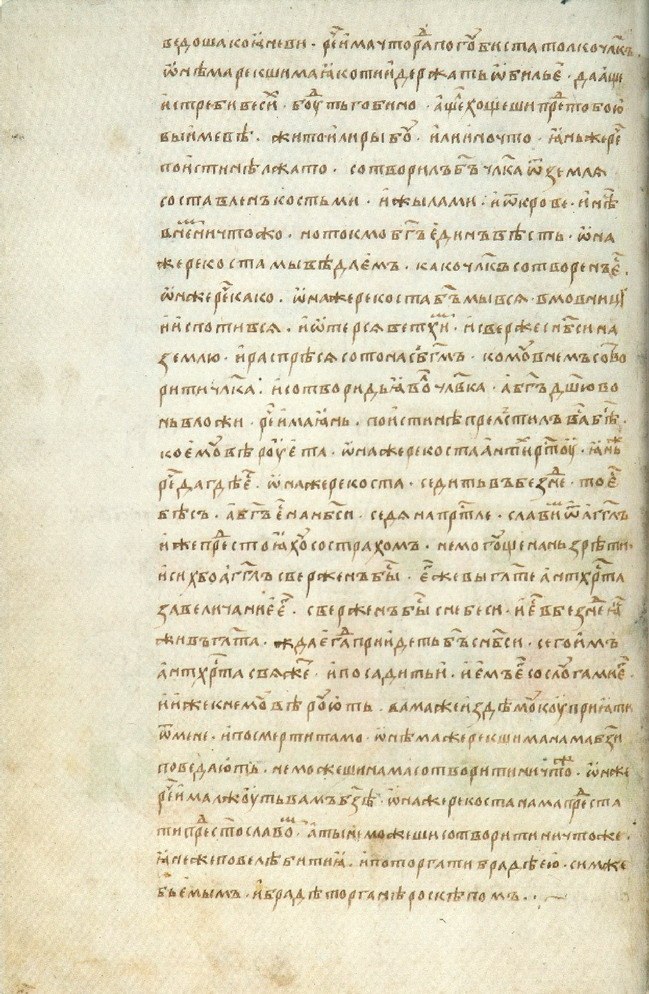
205

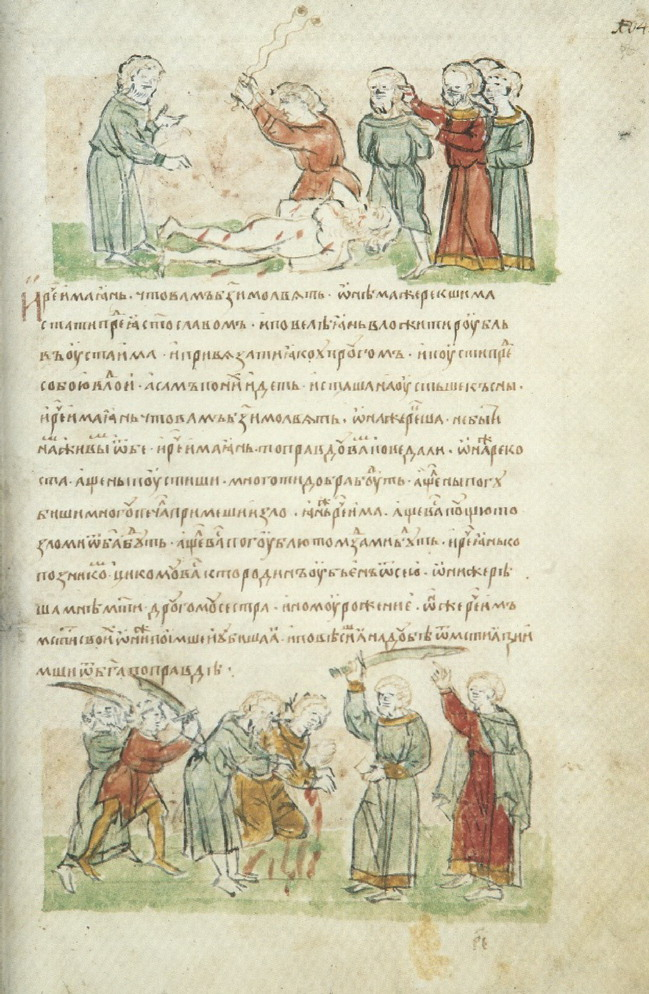
206

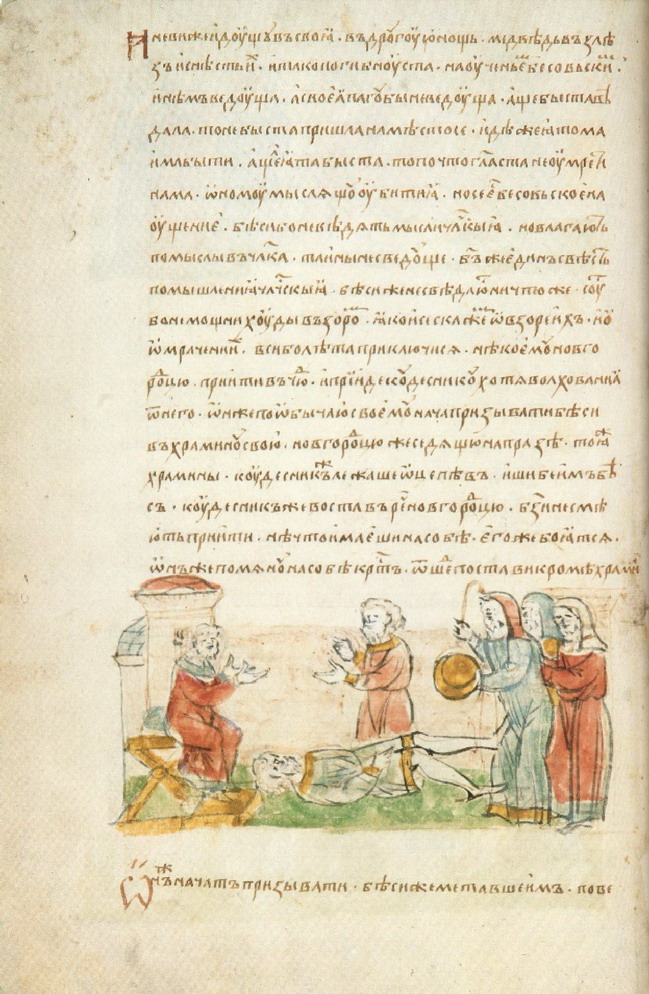
207

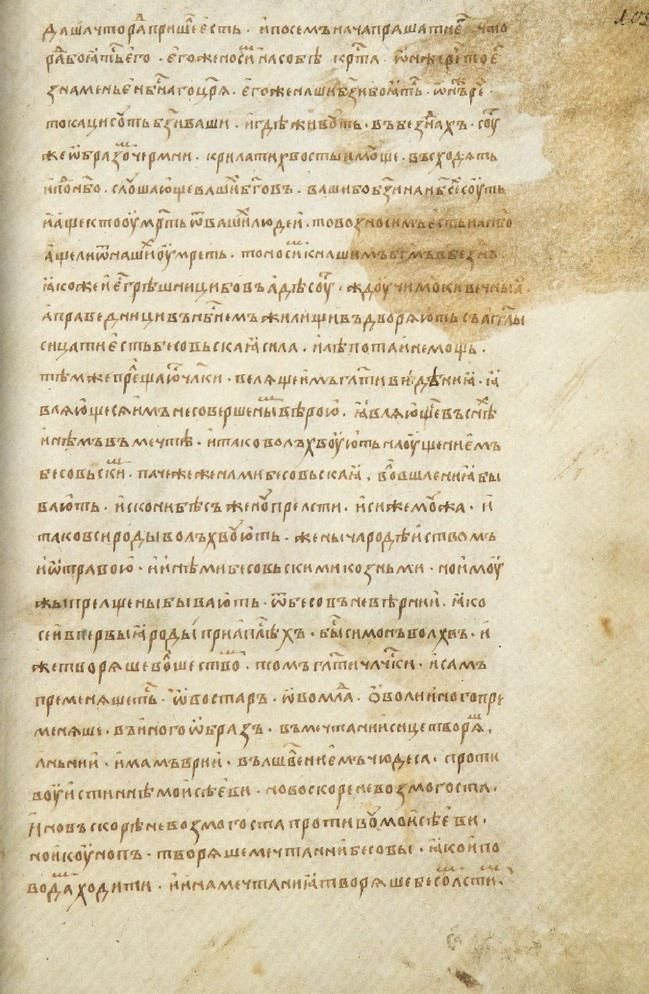
208

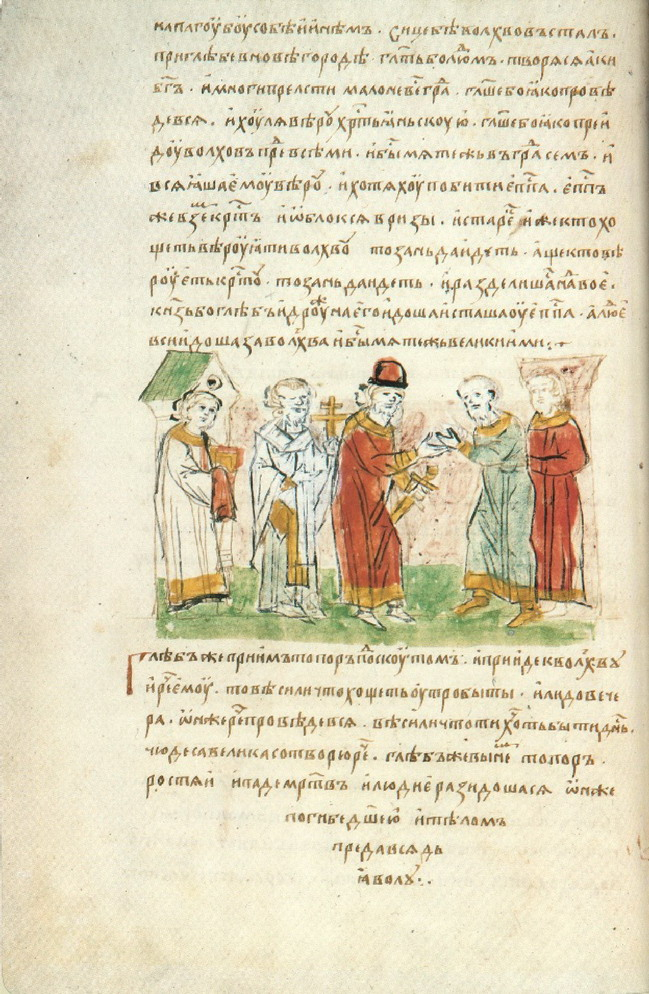
209

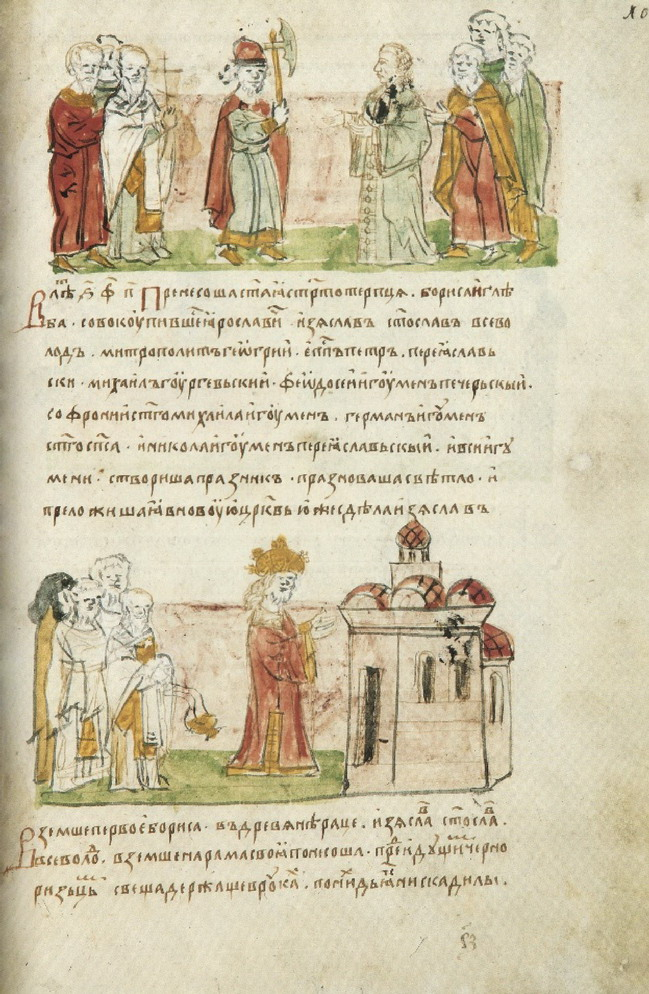
210

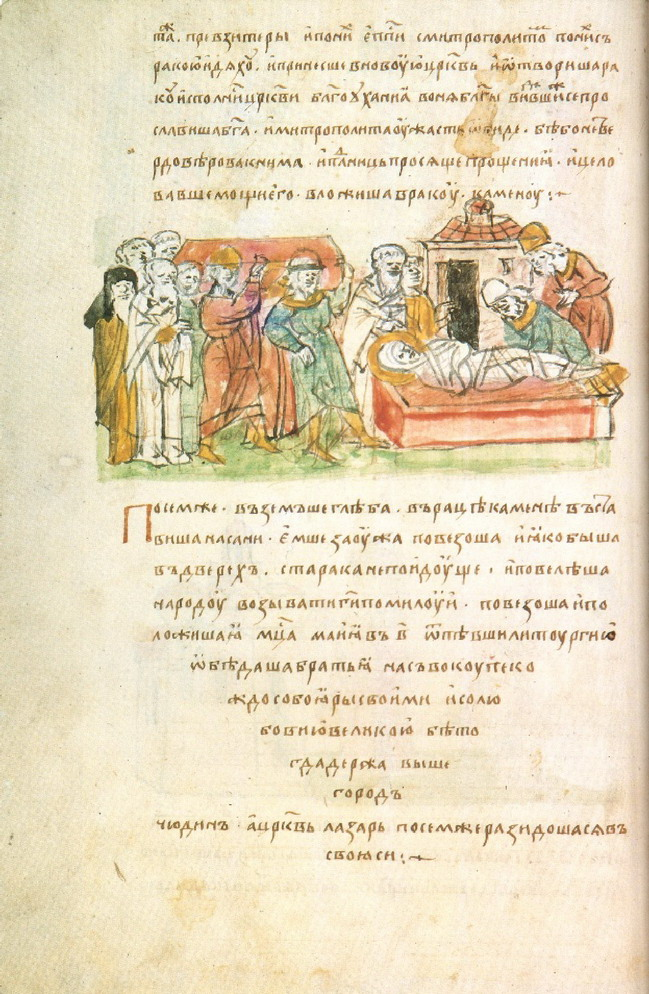
211

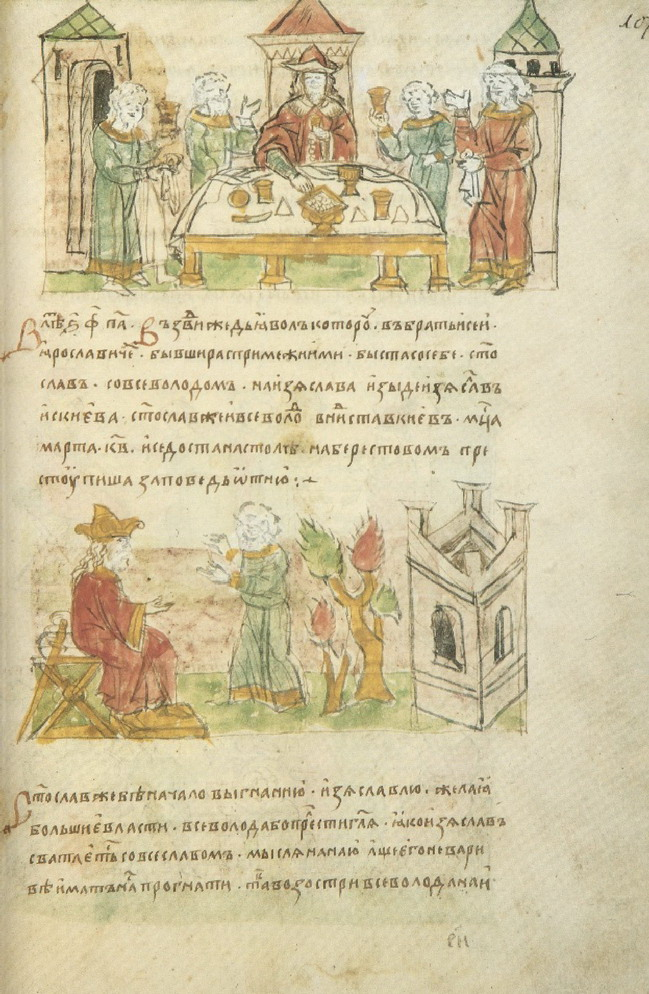
212

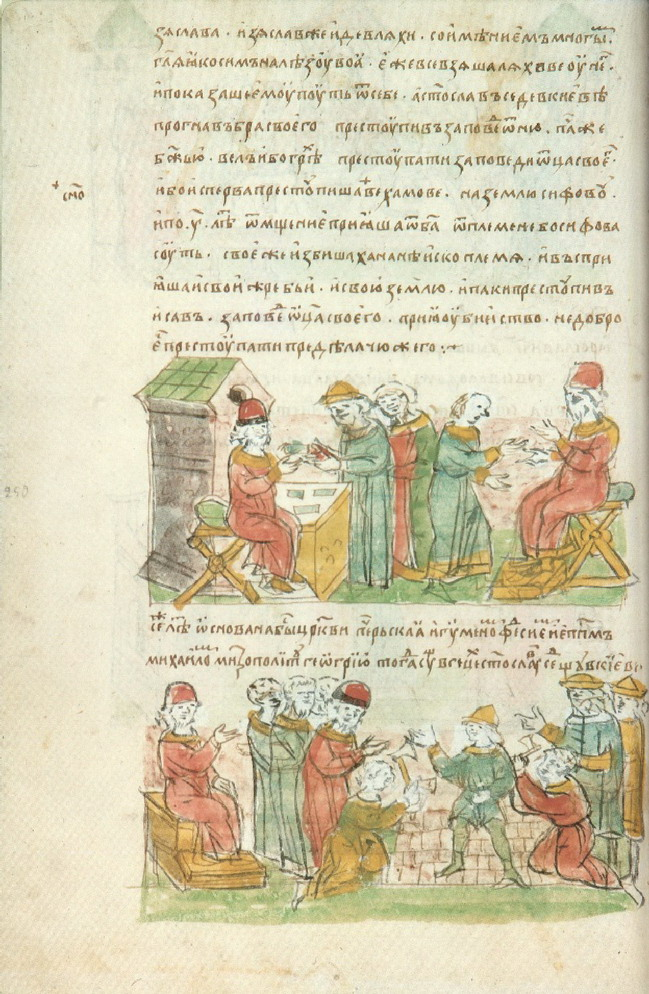
213

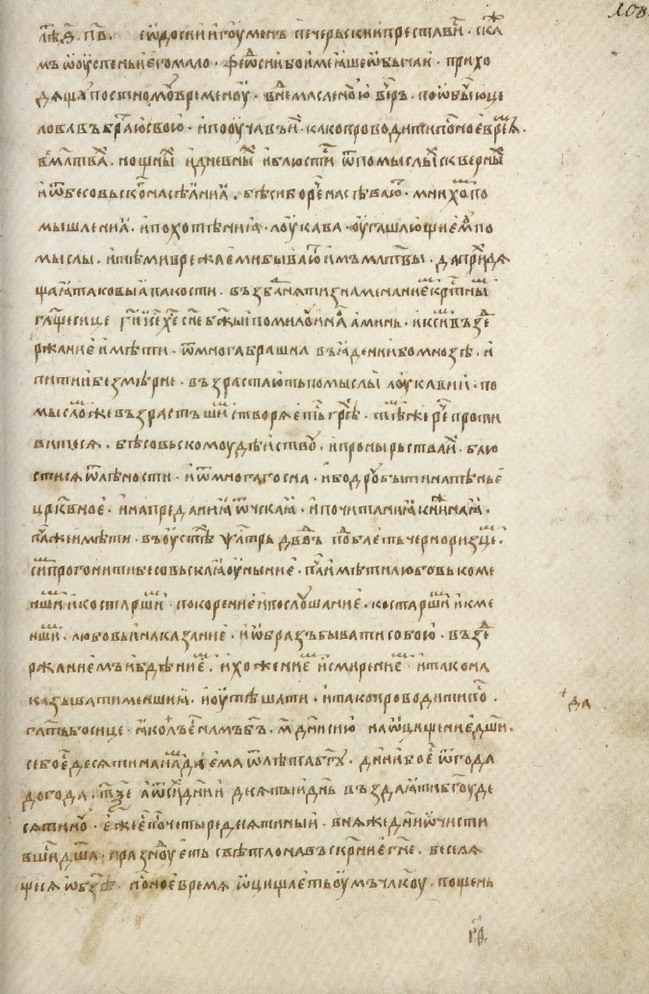
214

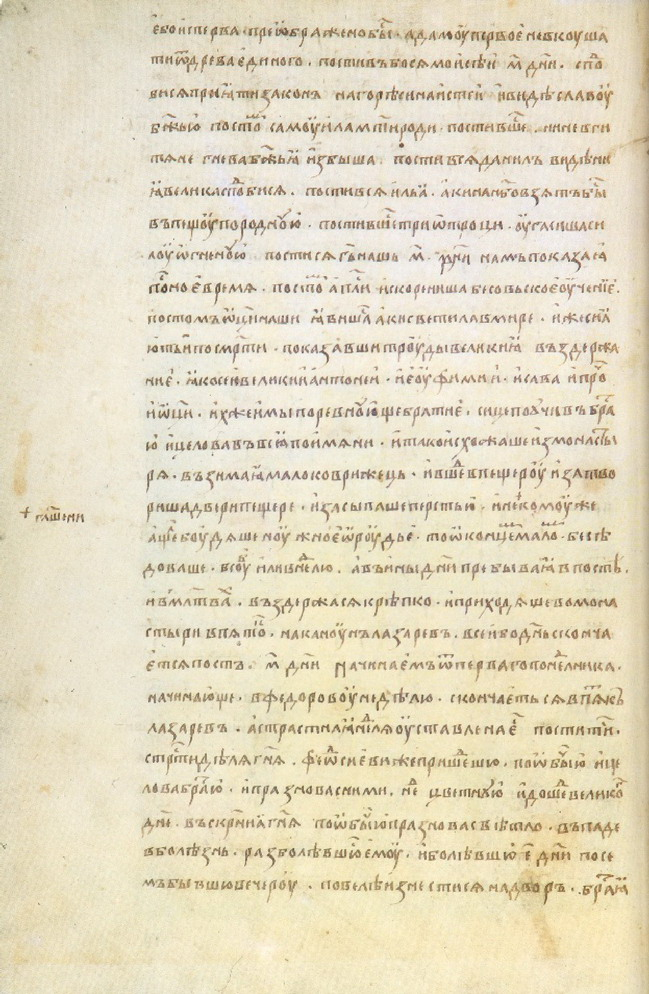
215

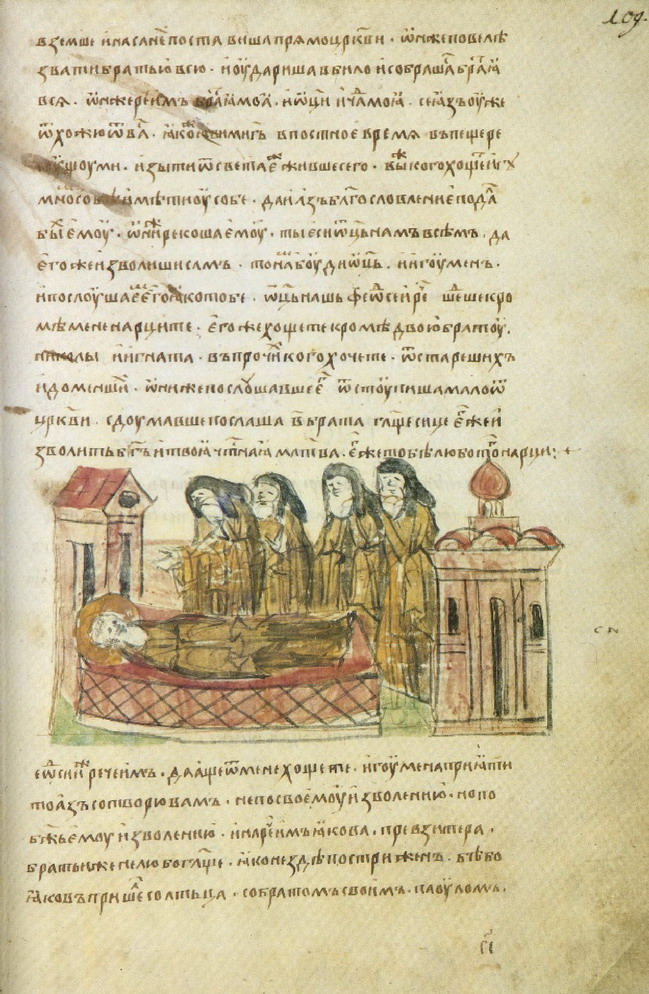
216

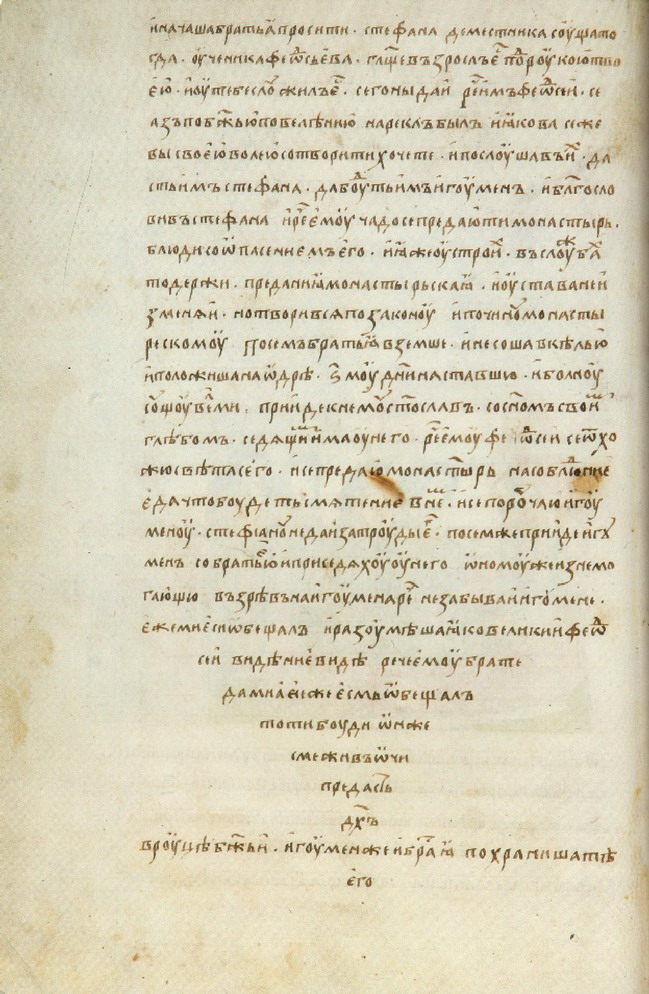
217

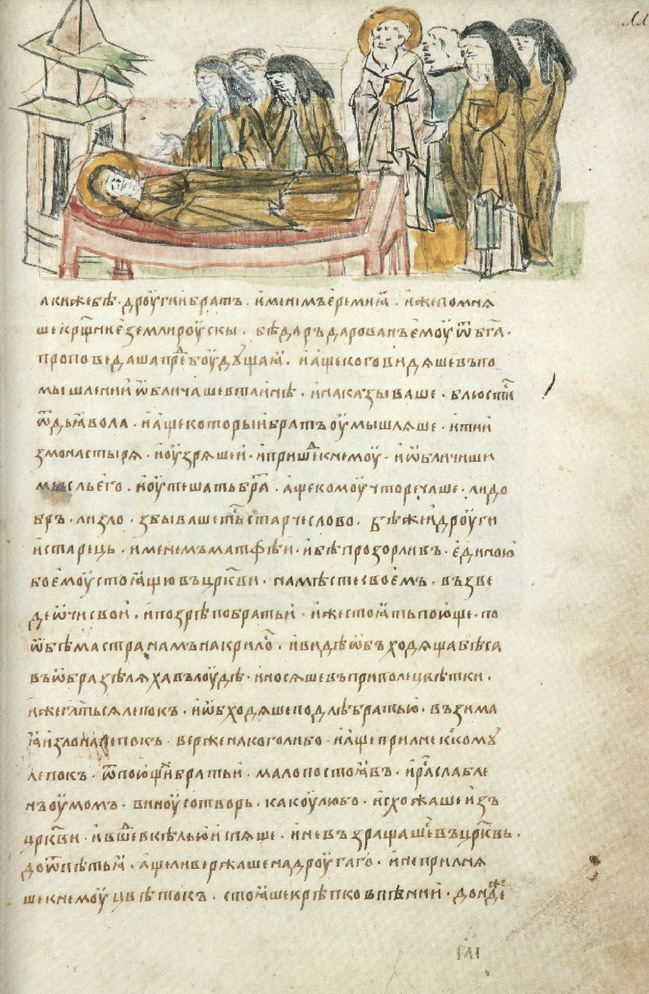
218

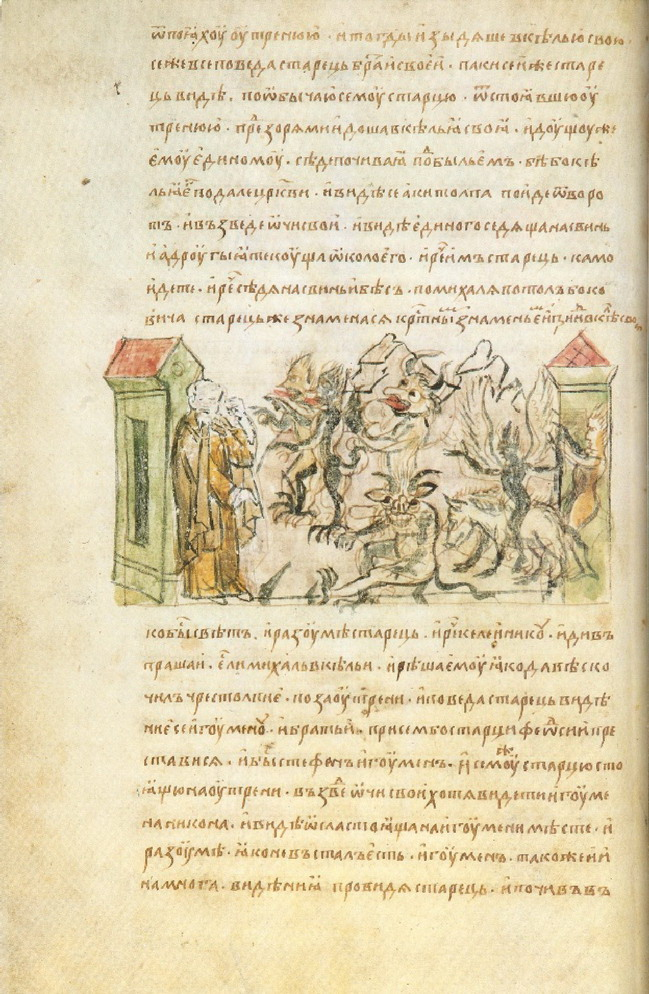
219

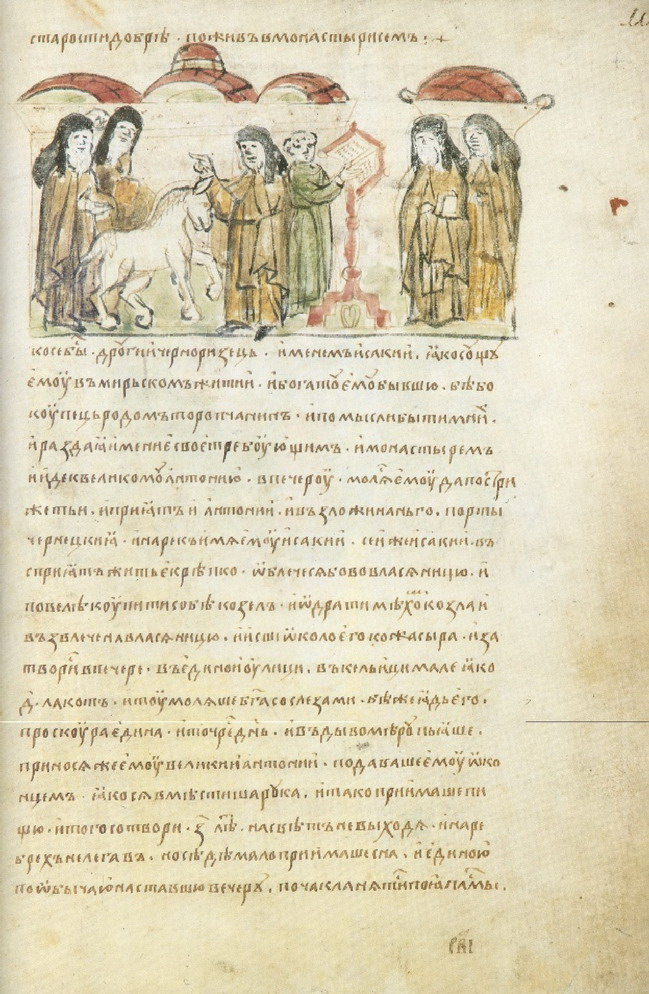
220

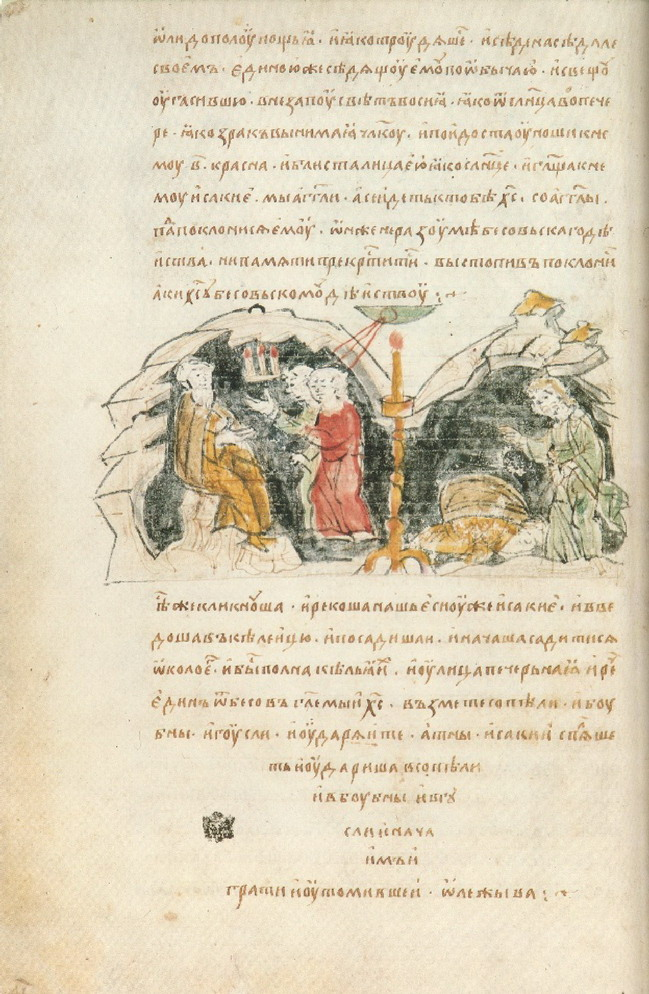
221

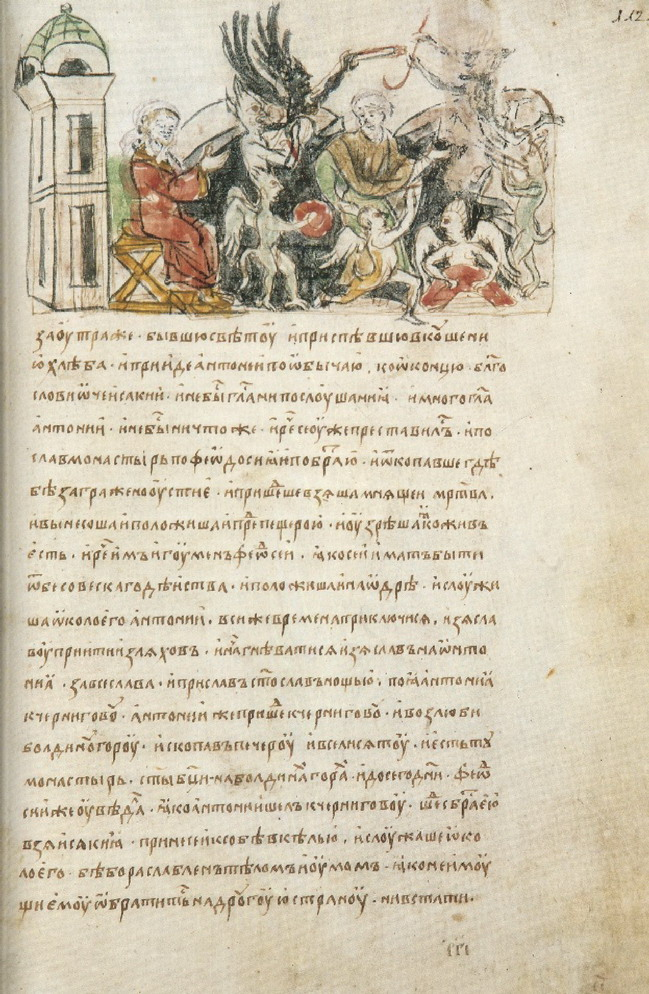
222

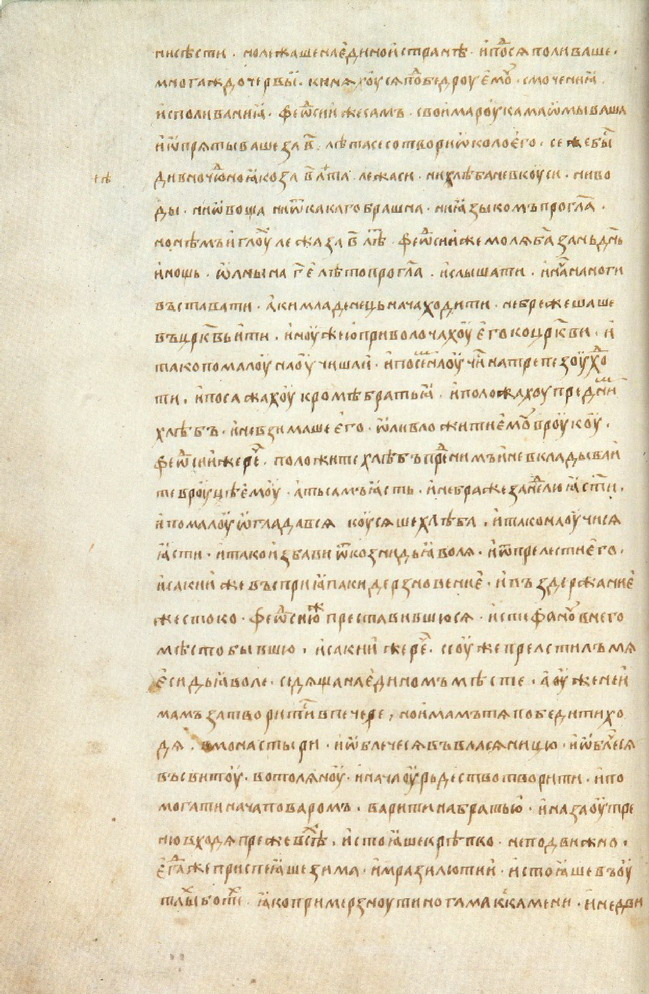
223

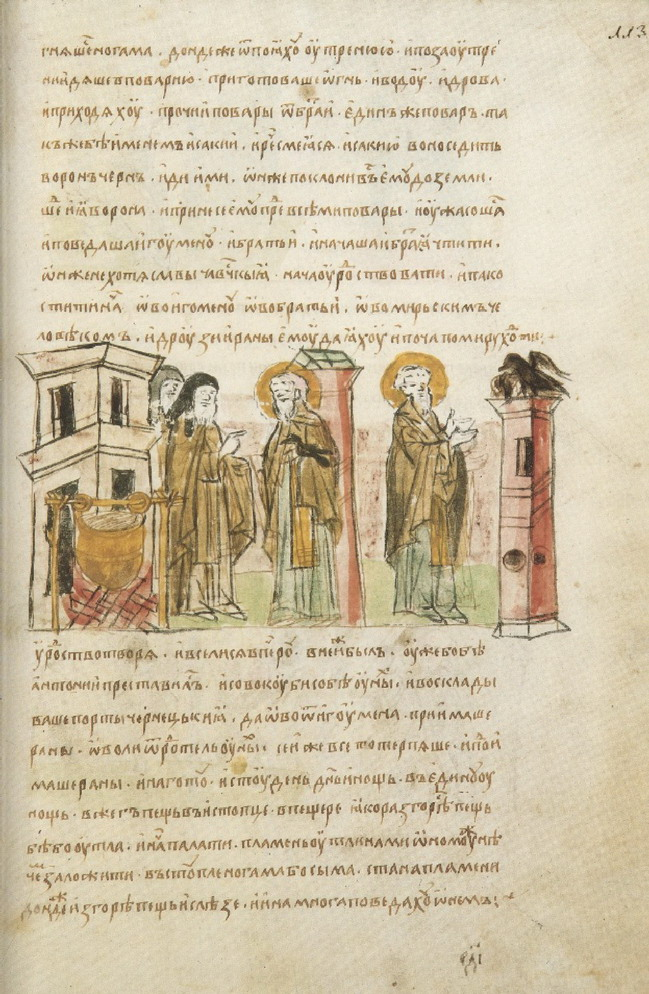
224

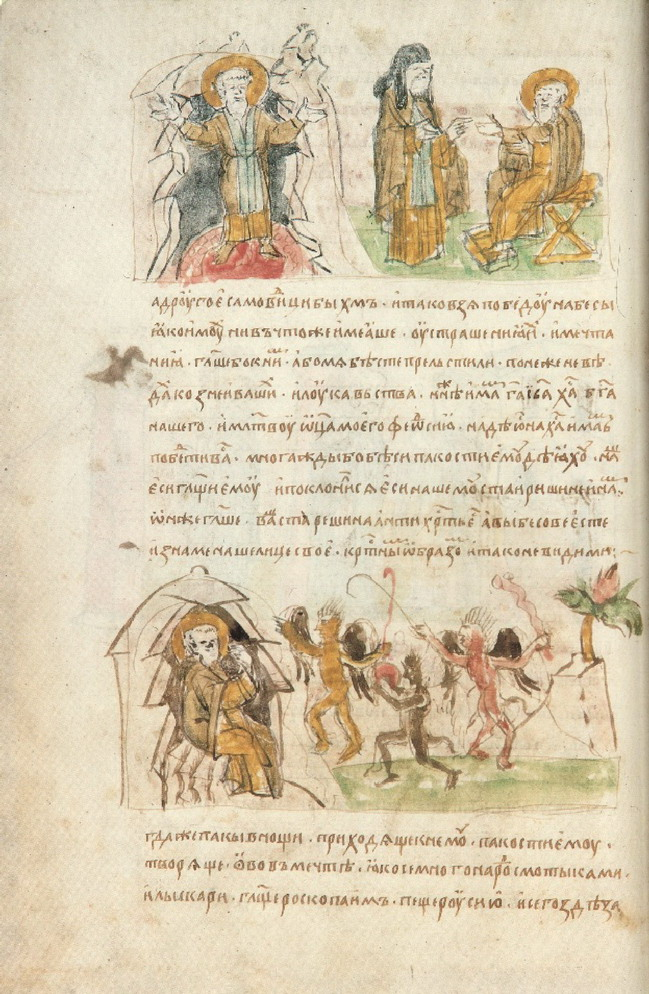
225

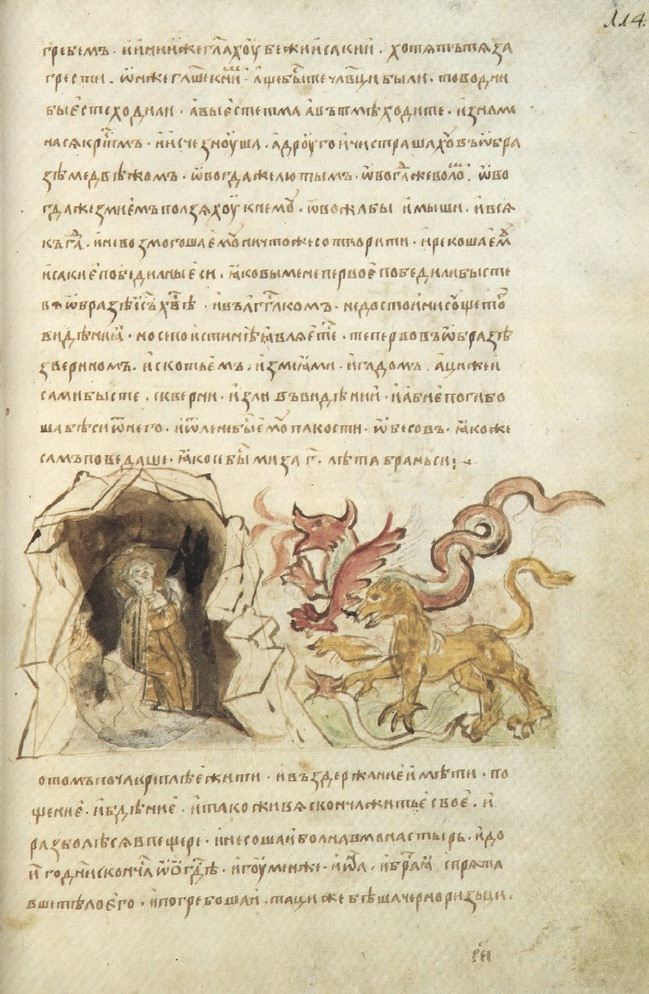
226

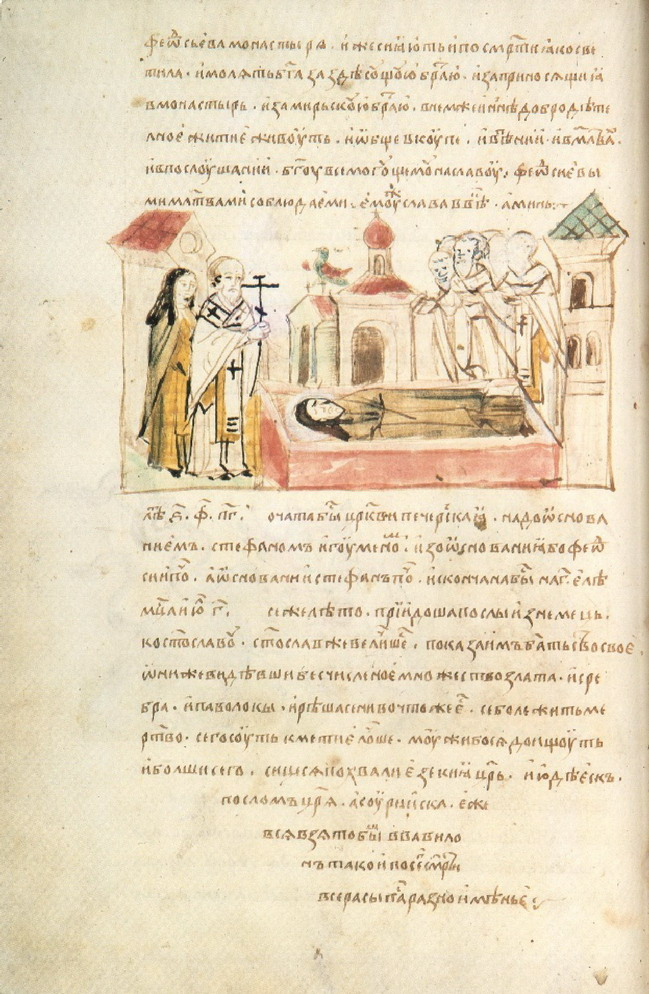
227

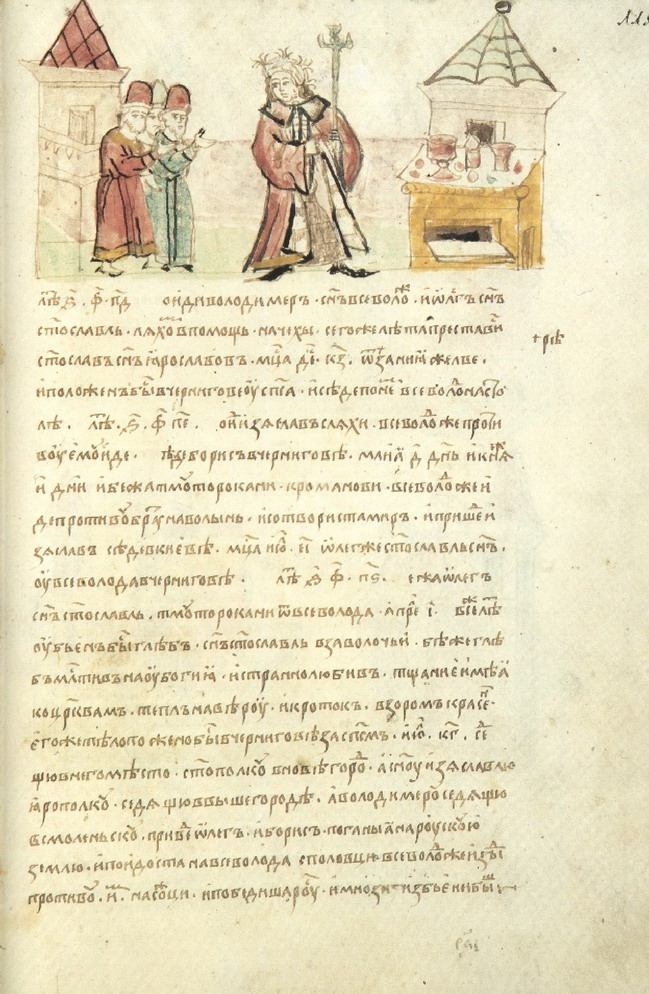
228

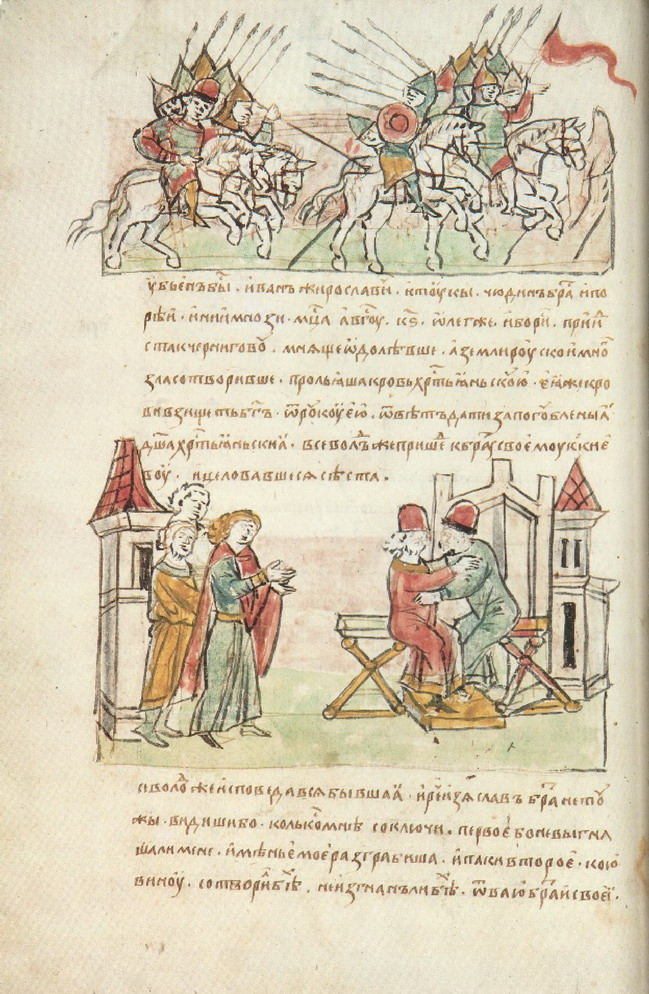
229

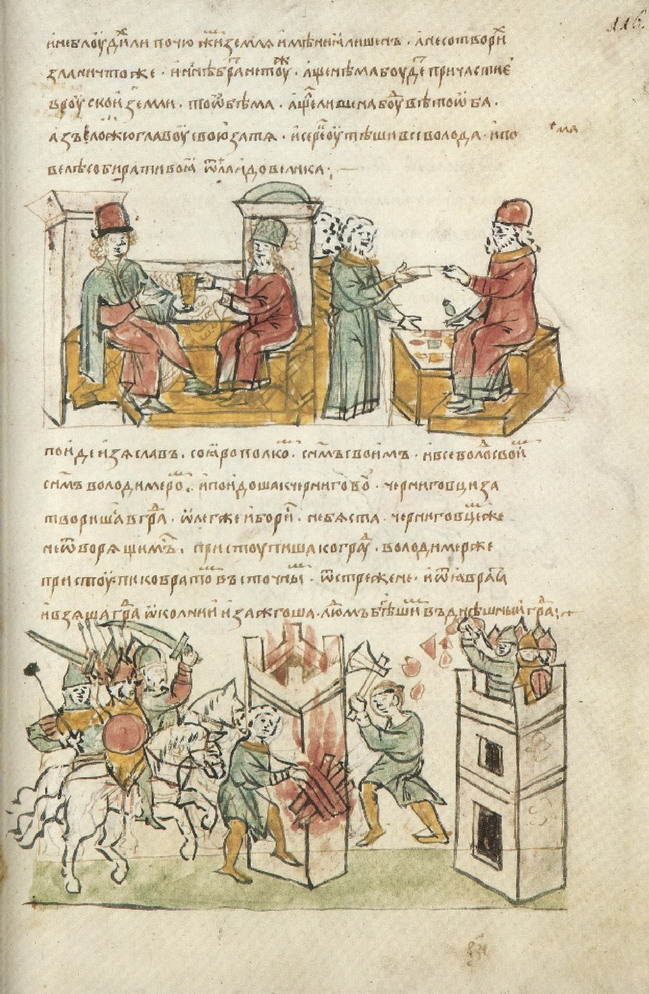
230

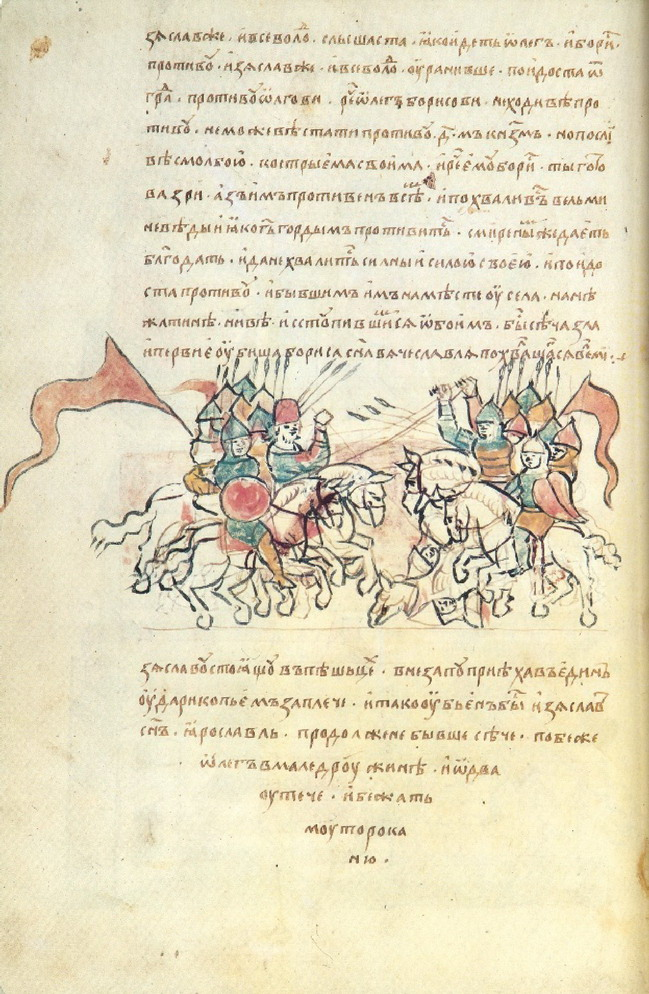
231

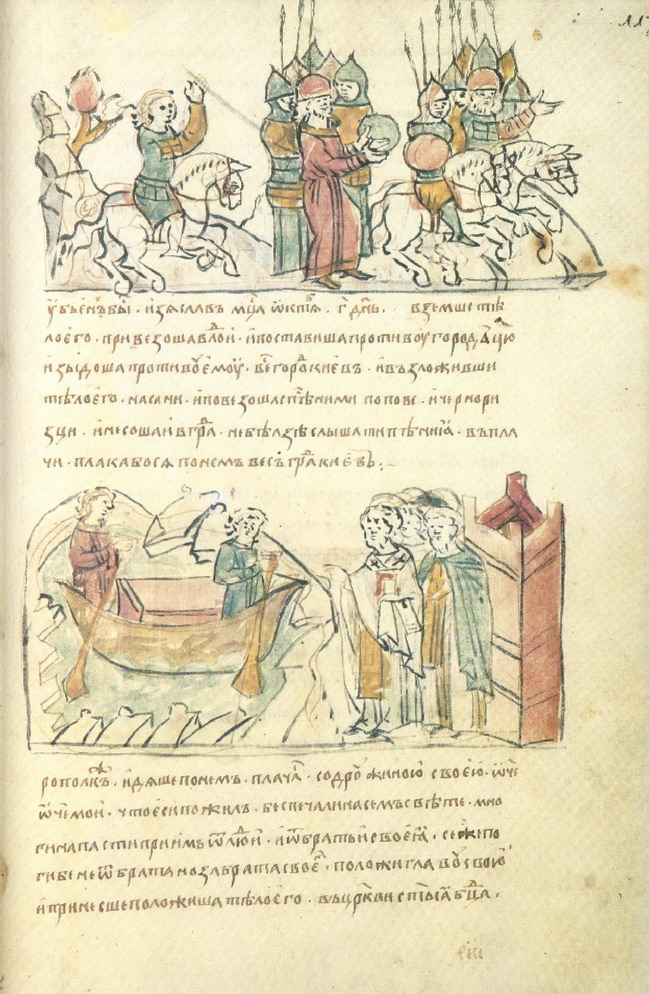
232

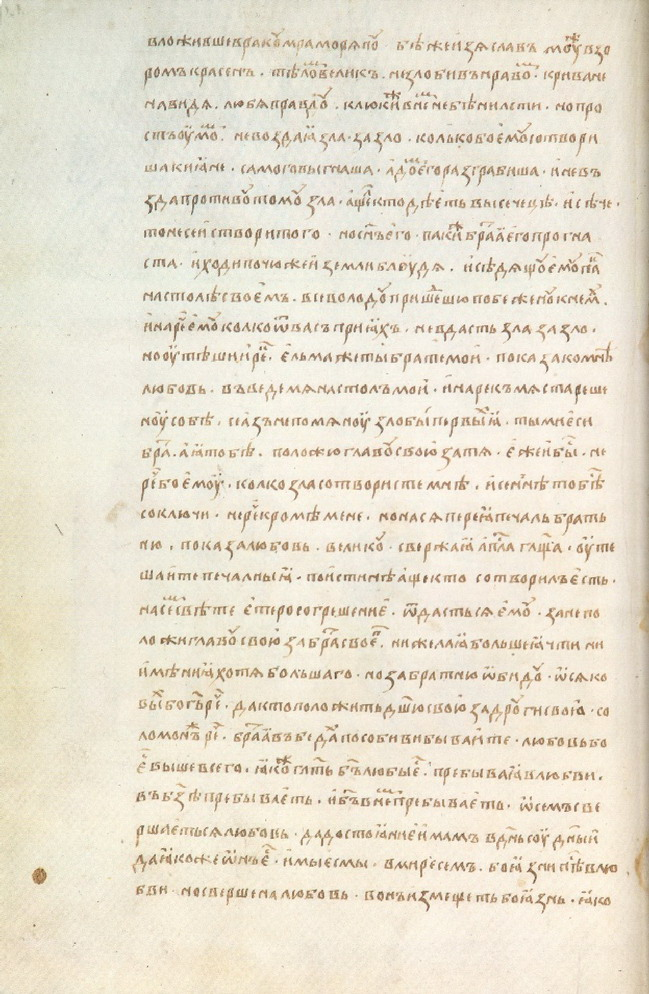
233

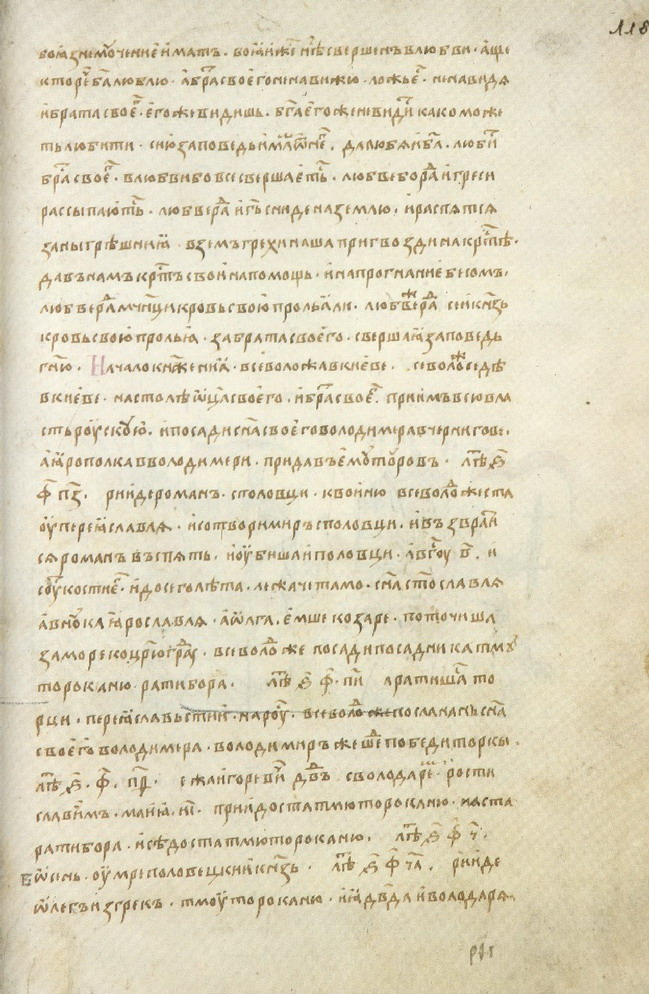
234

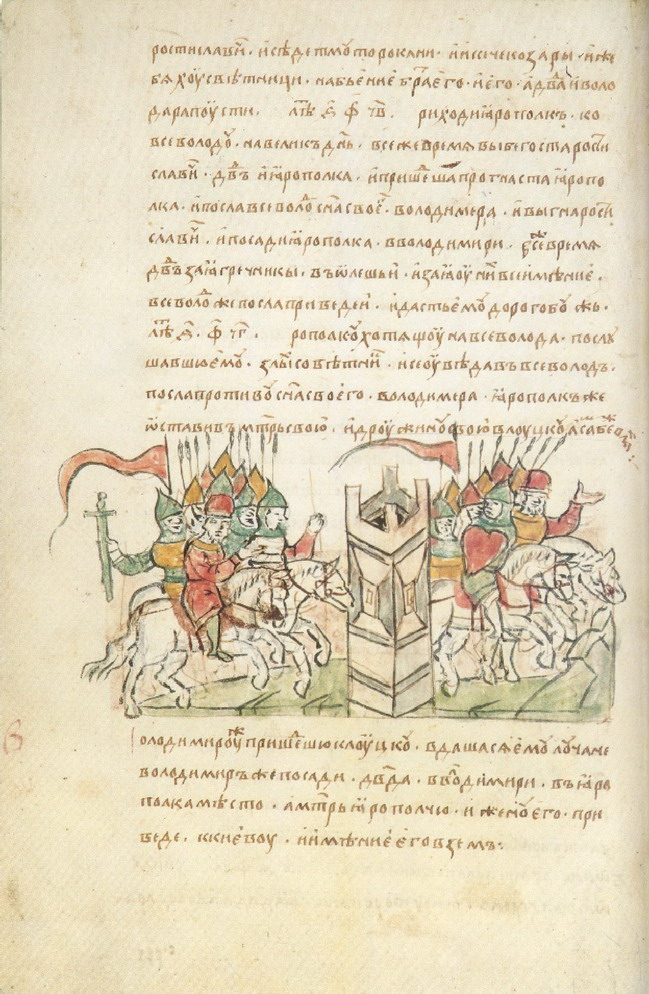
235

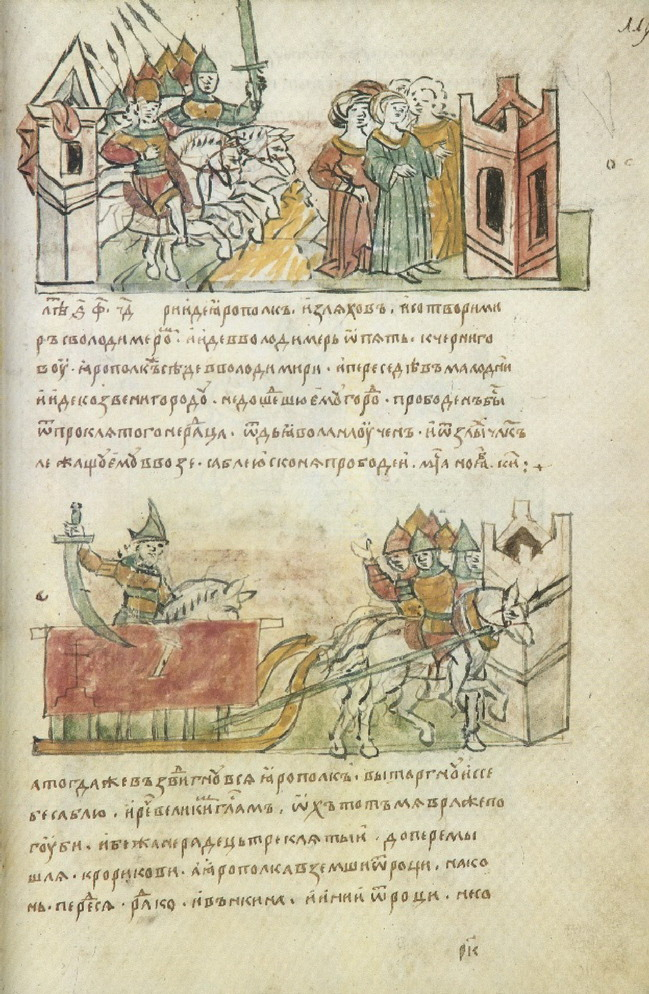
236

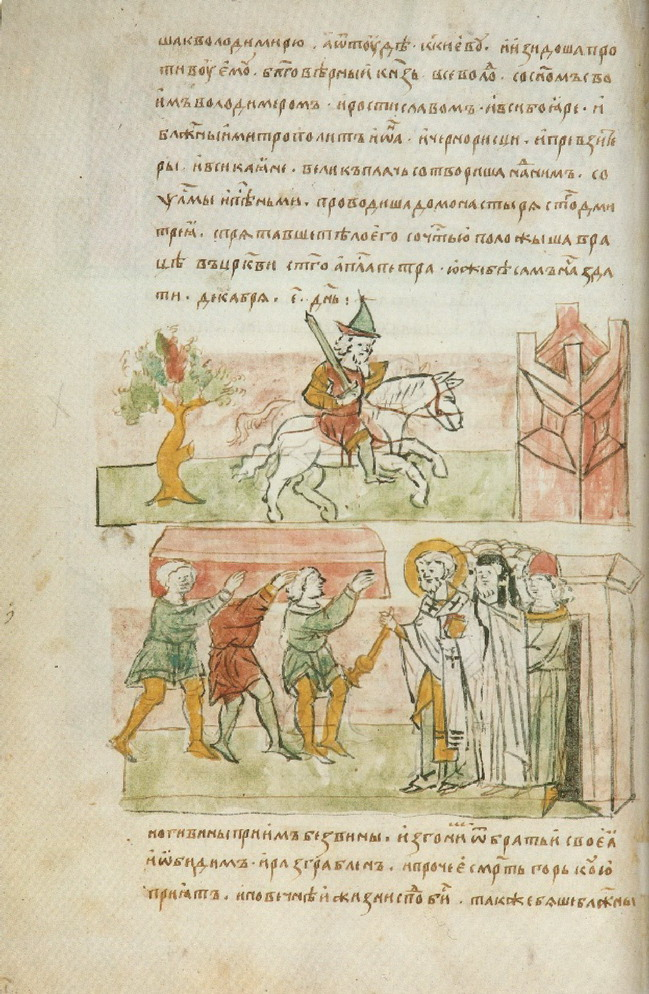
237

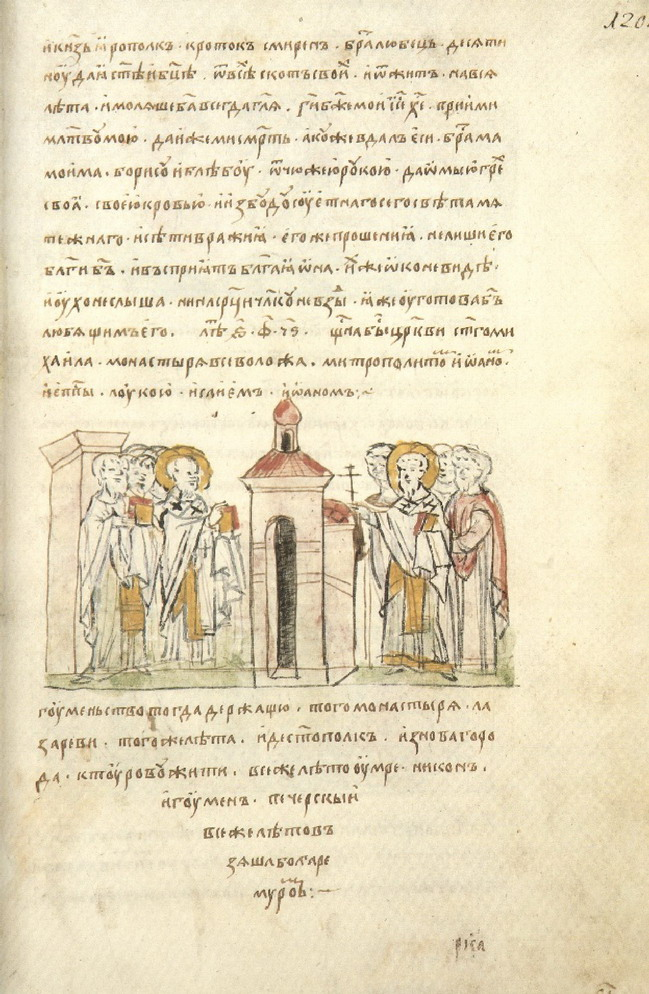
238

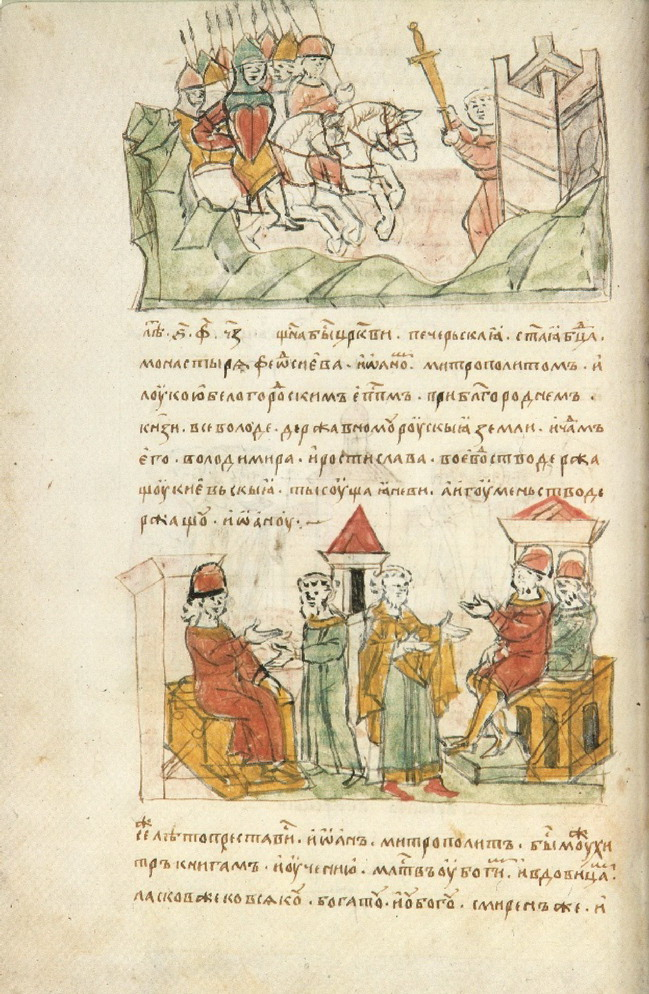
239

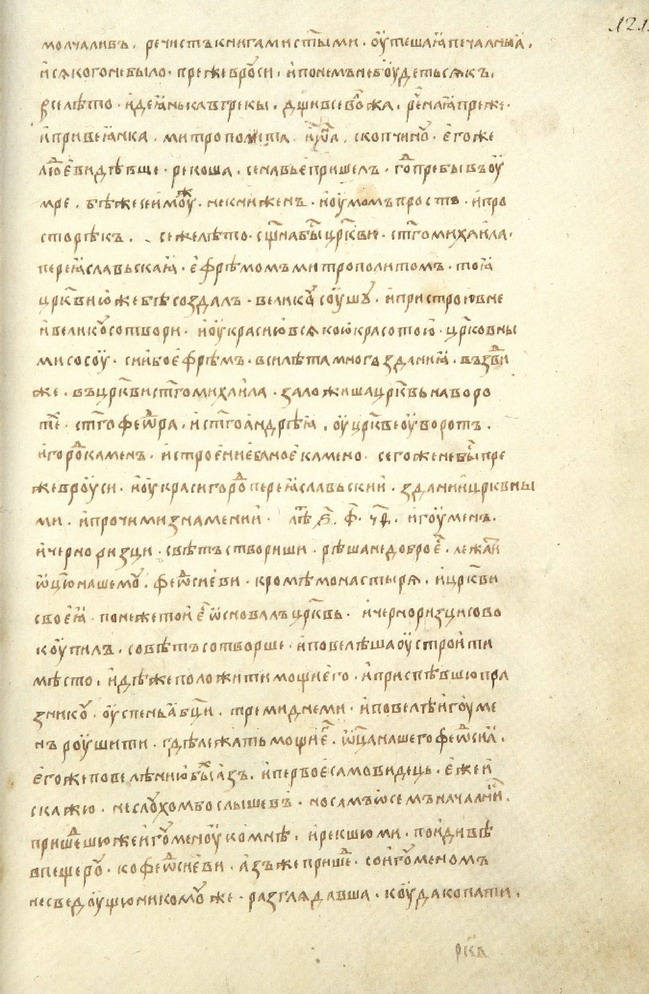
240

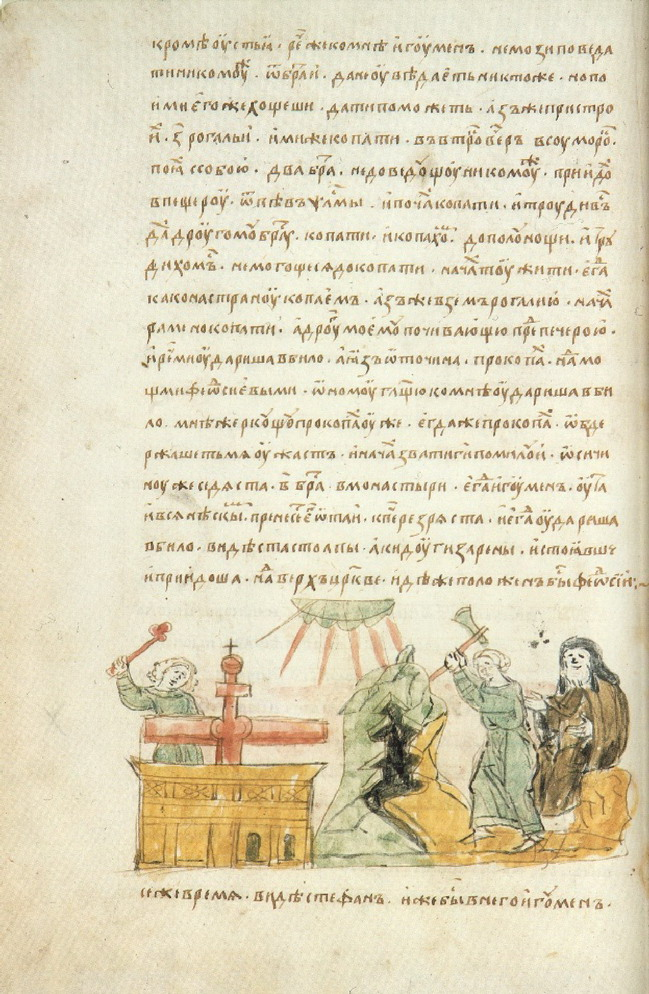
241

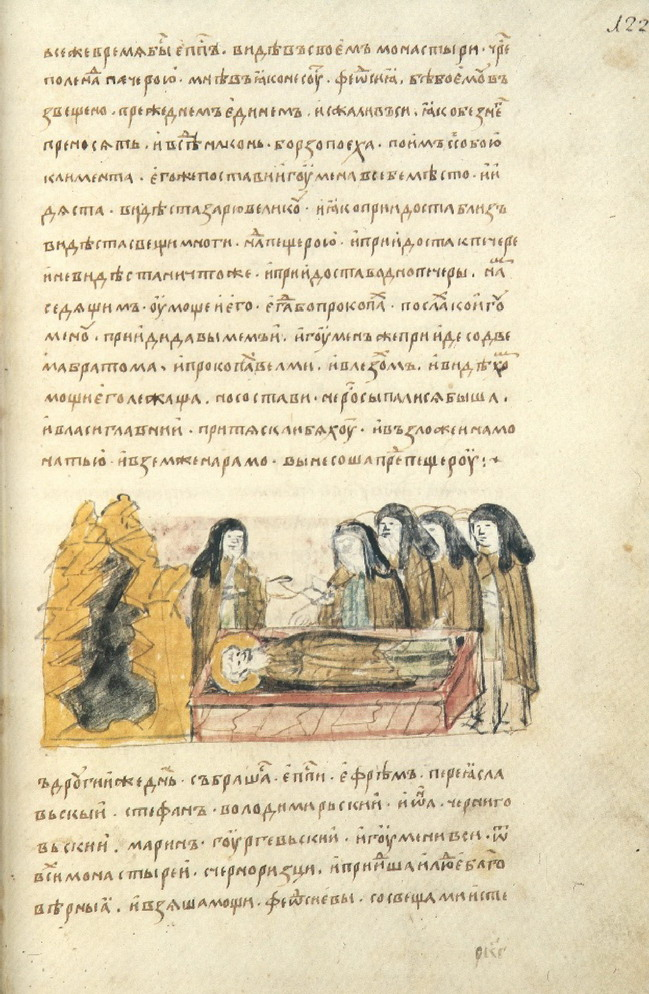
242

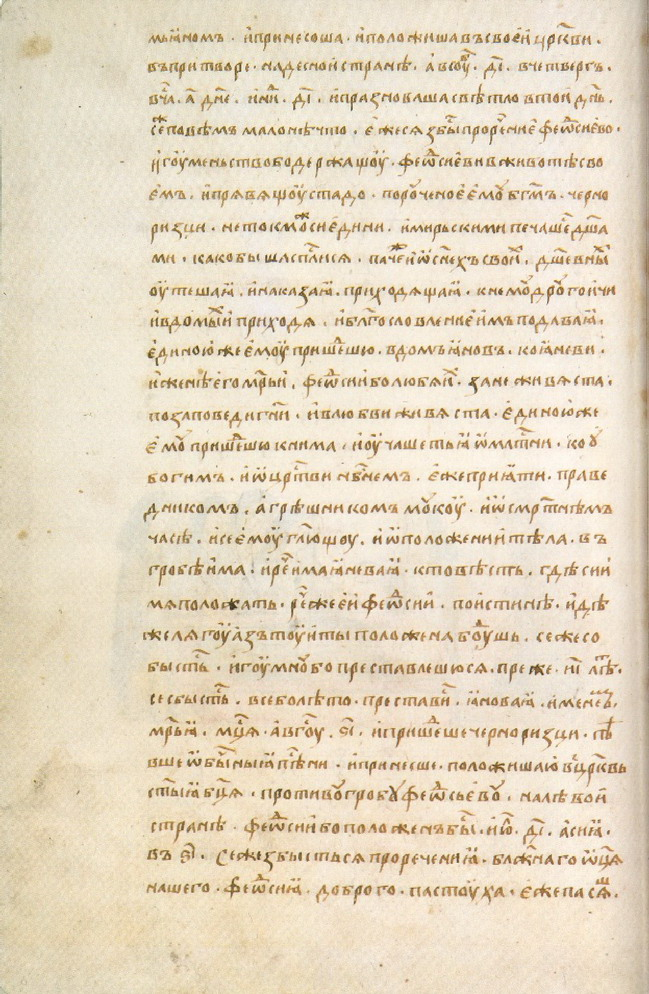
243

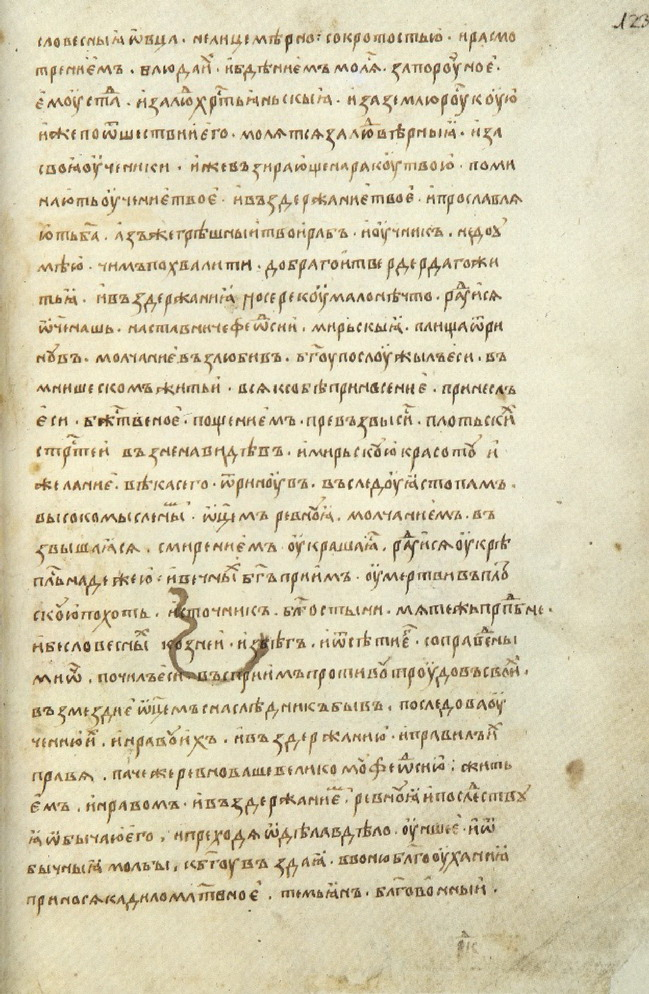
244

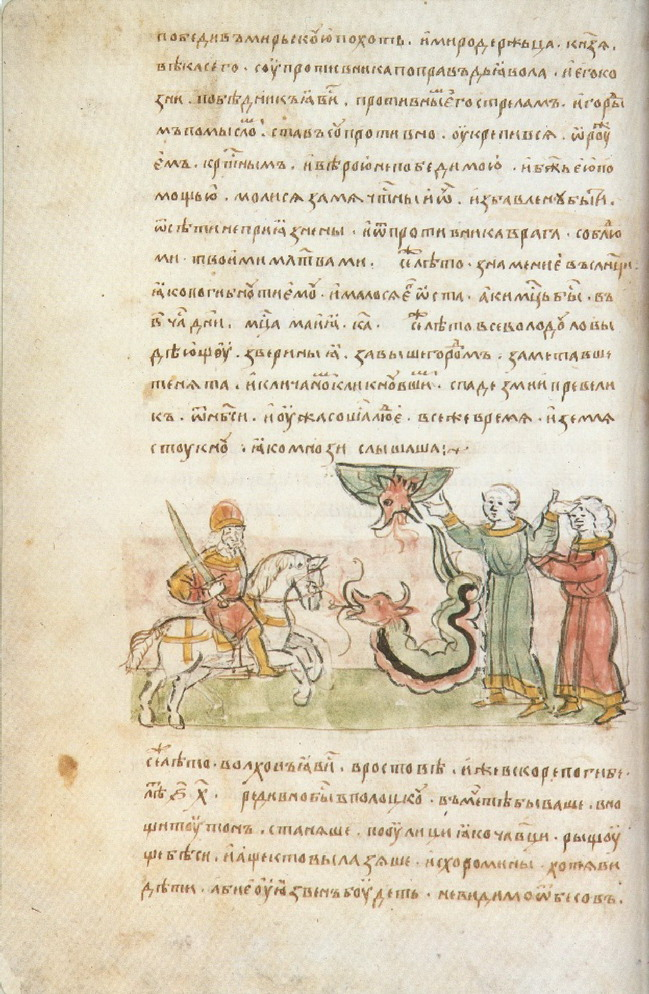
245

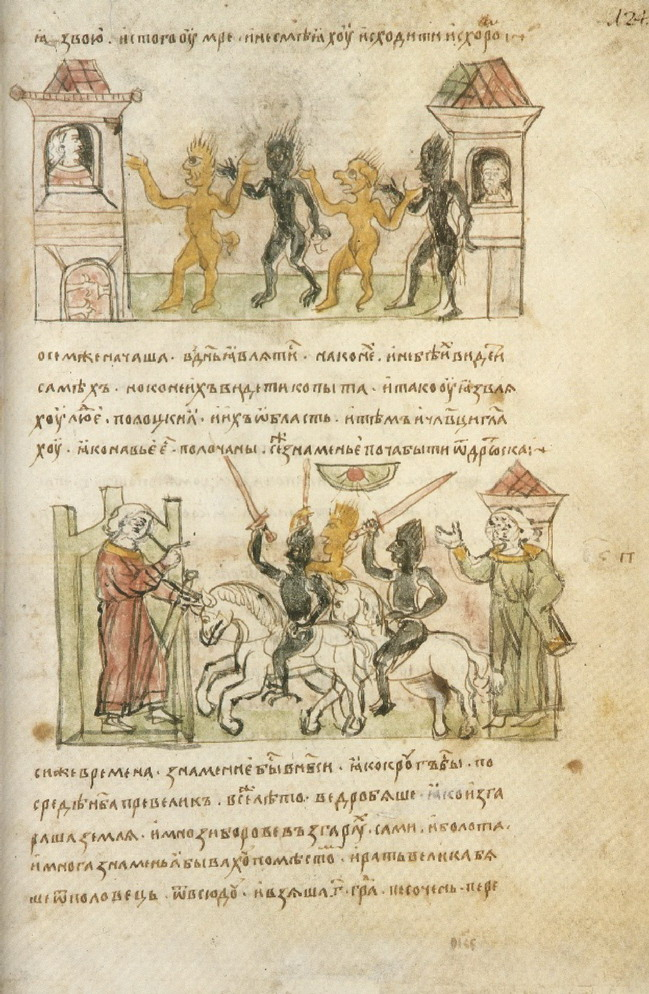
246

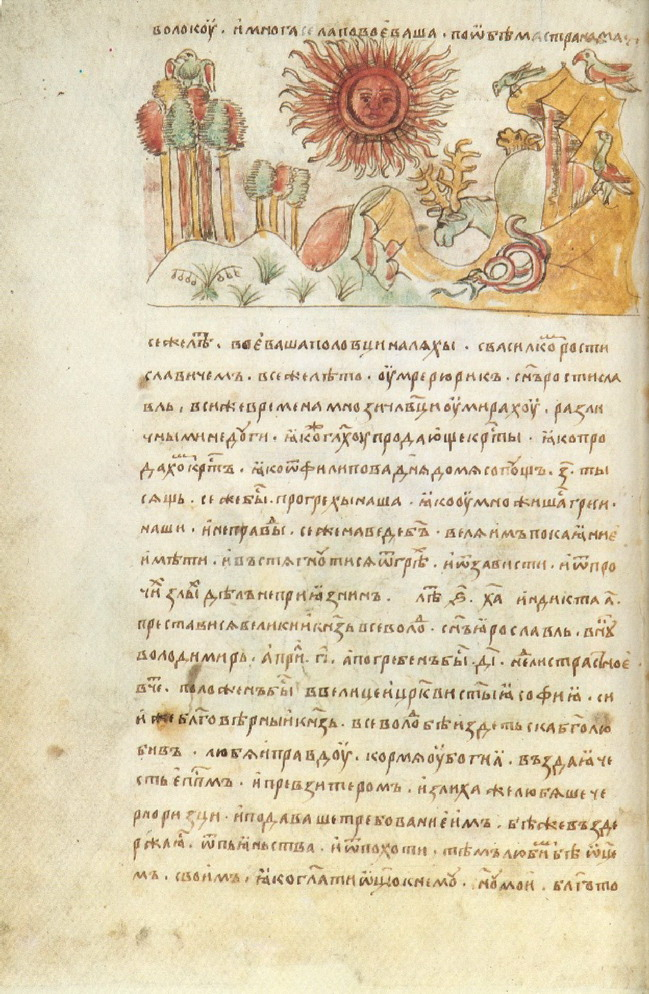
247

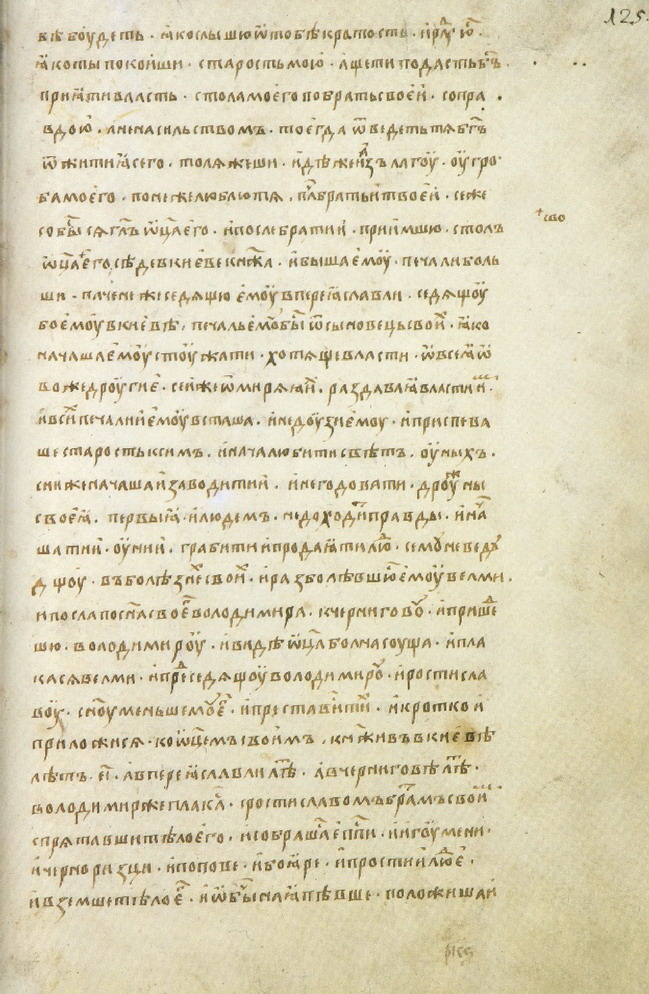
248

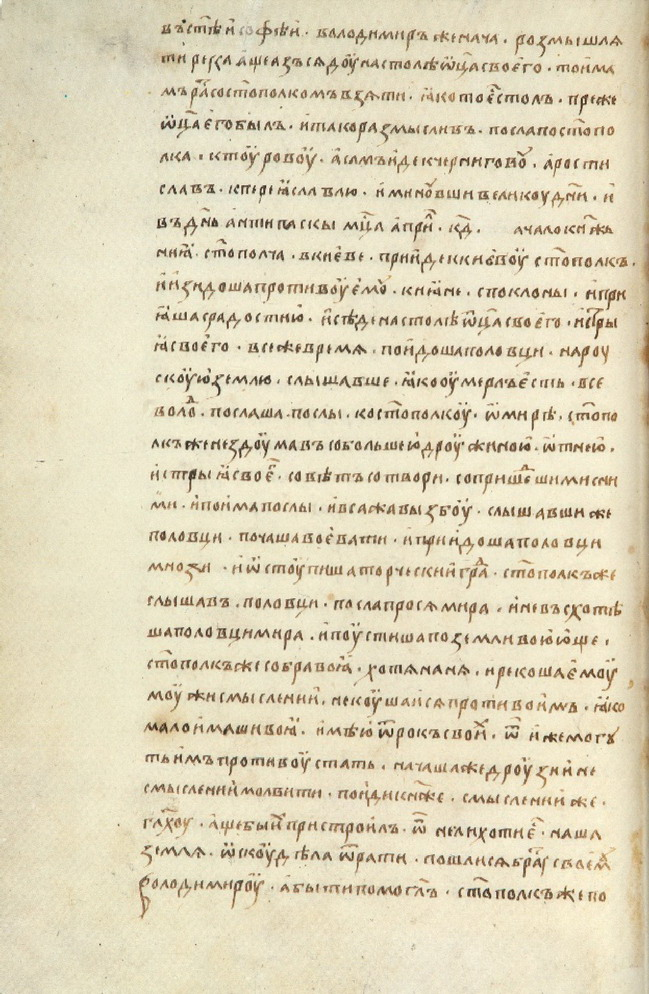
249

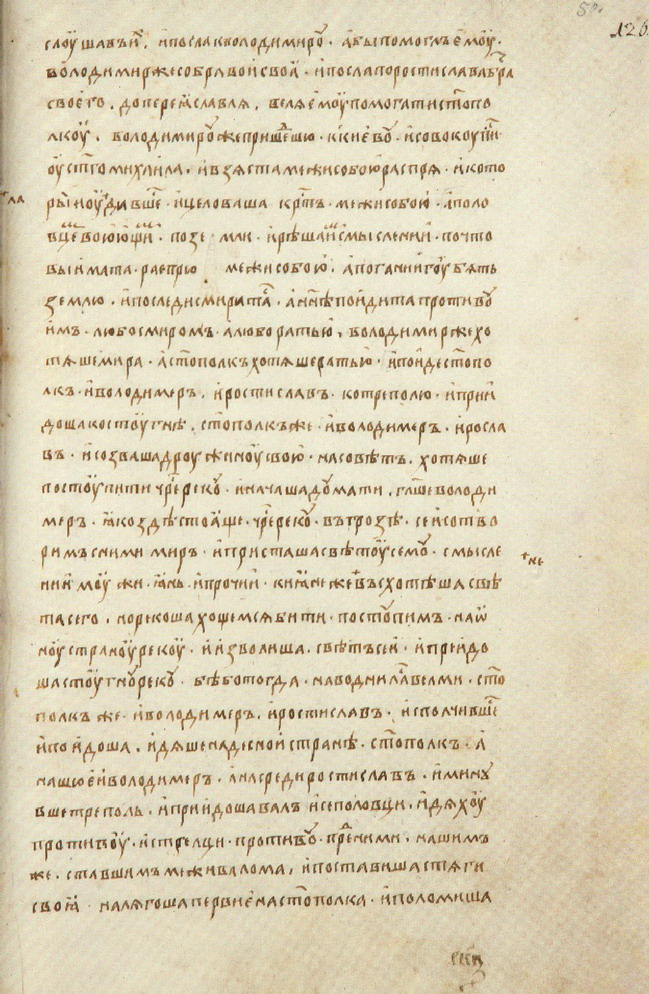
250

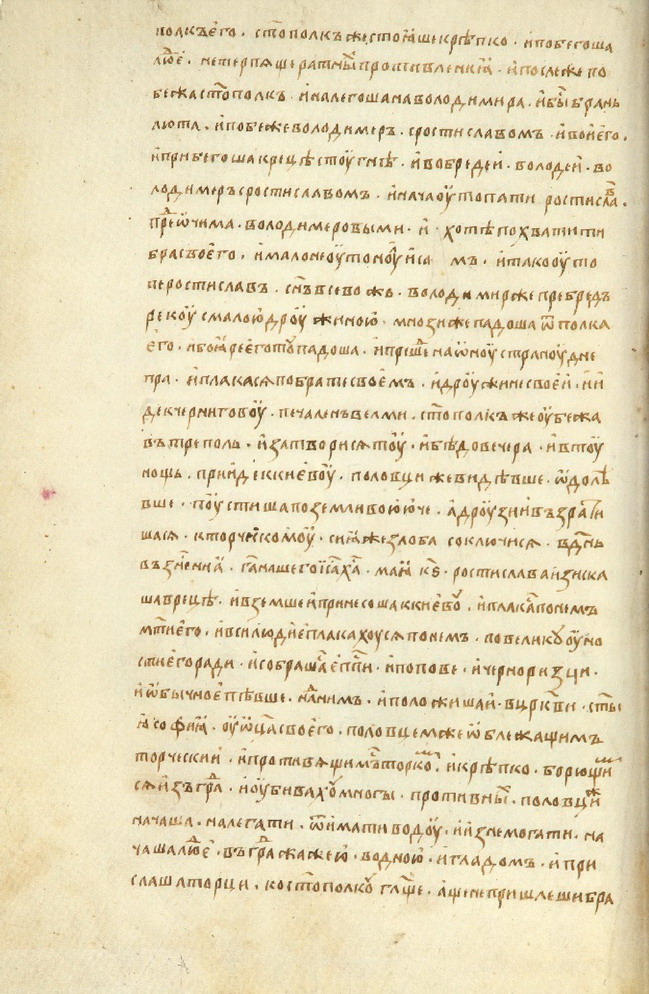
251

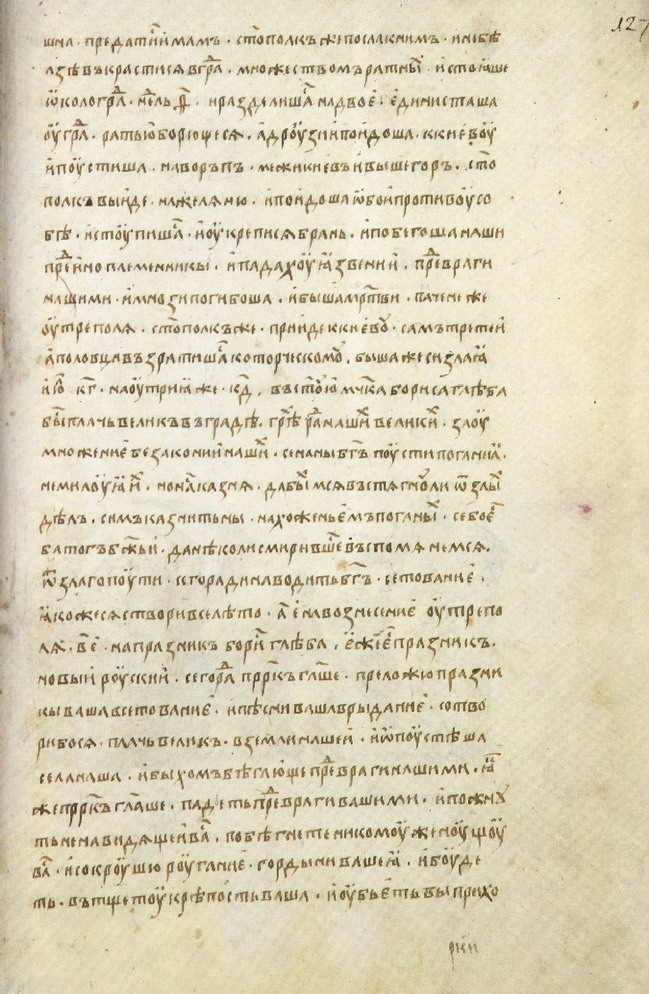
252

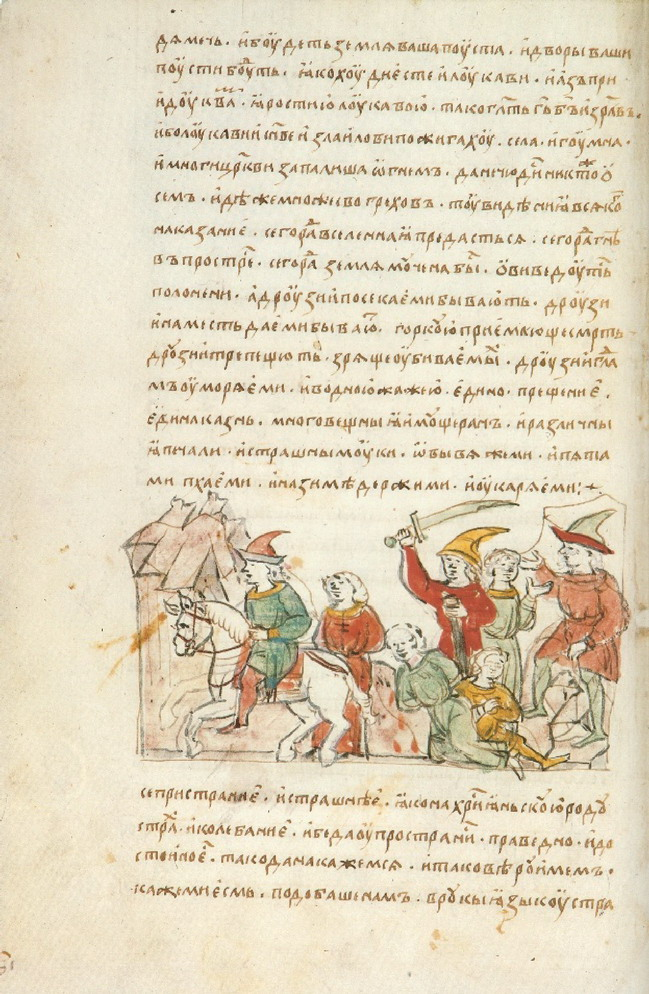
253

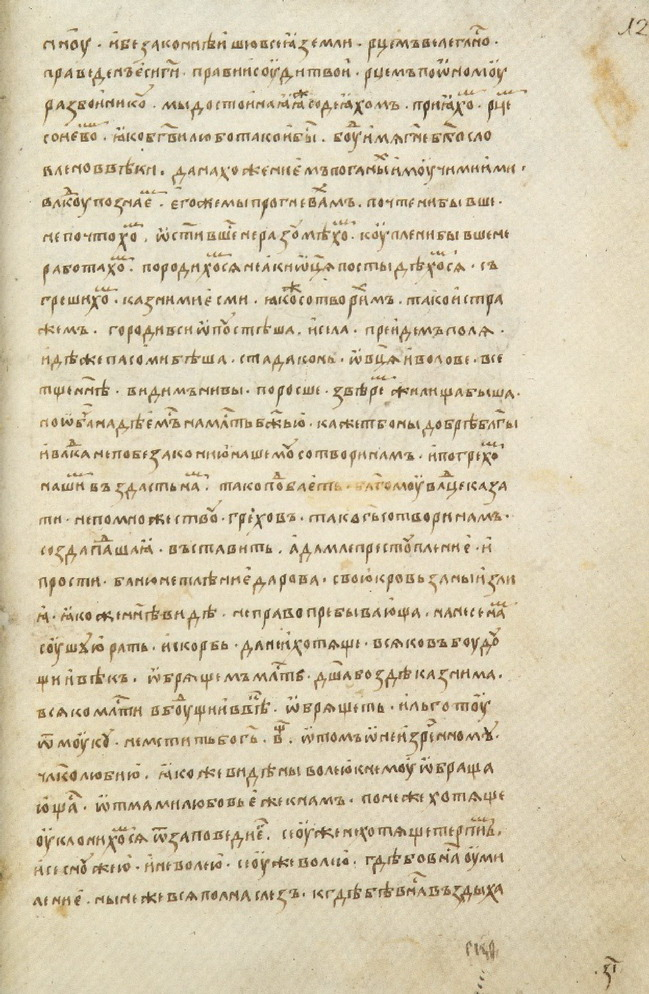
254

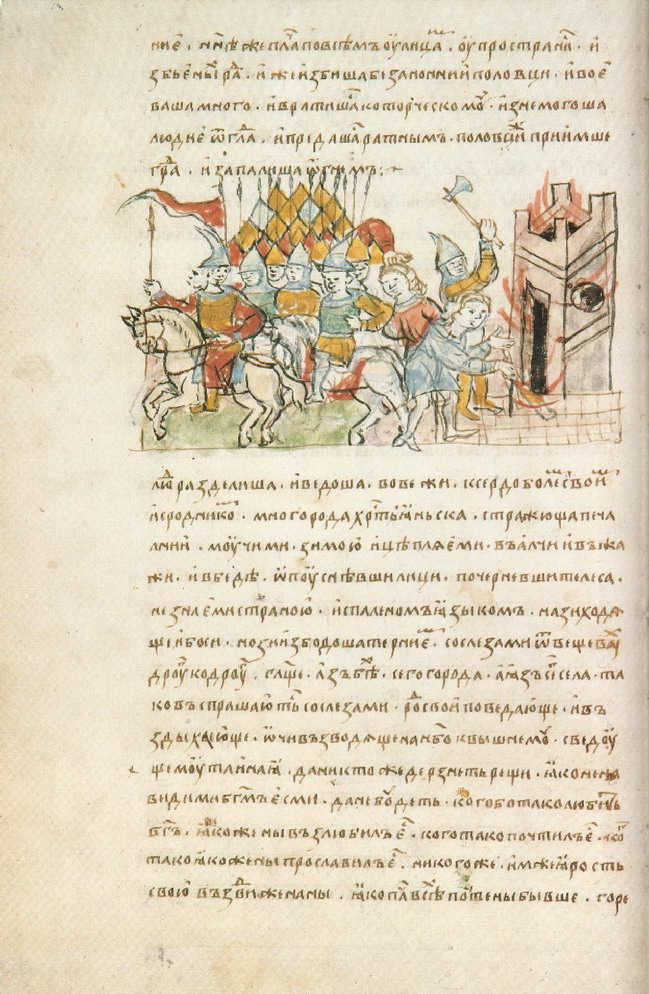
255

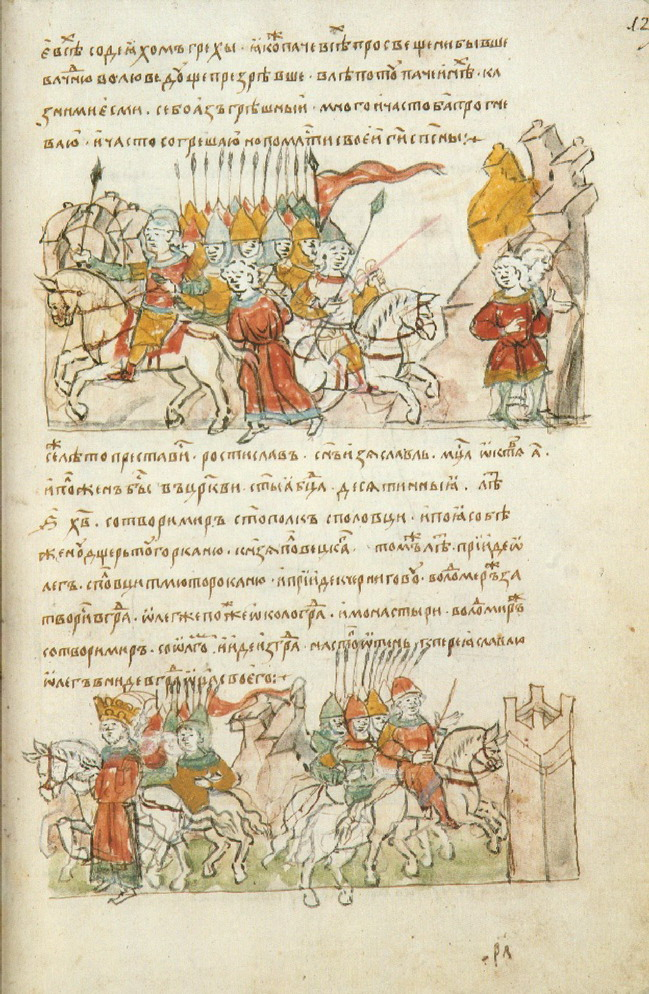
256

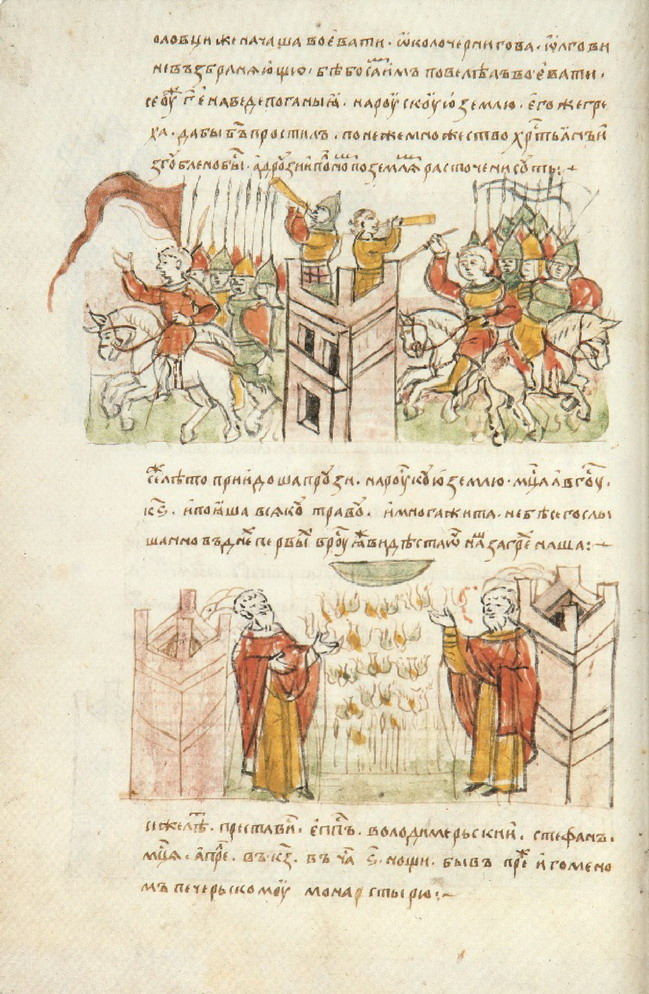
257

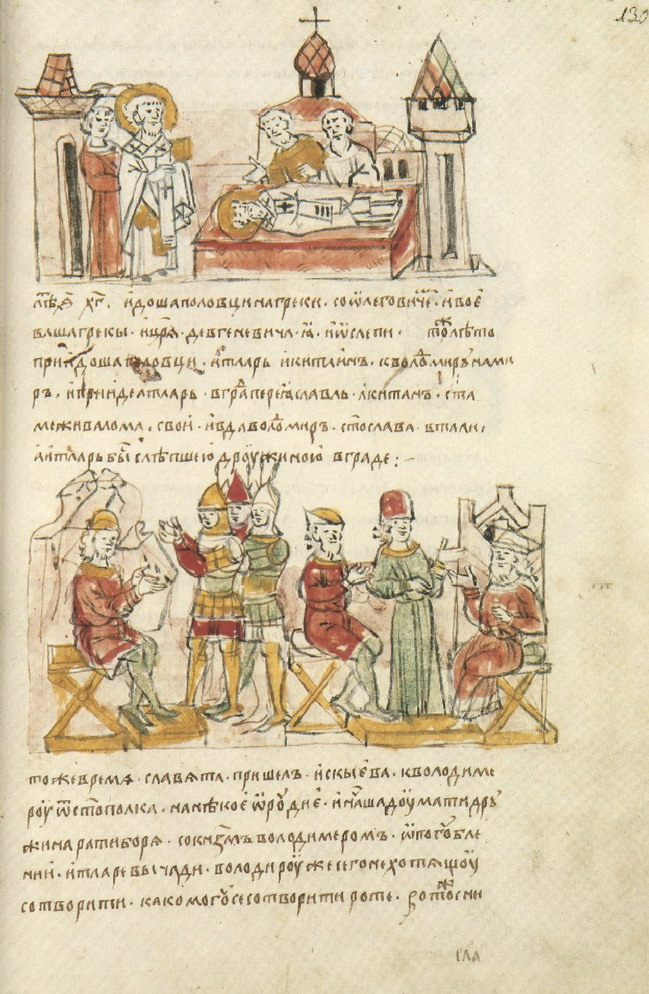
258

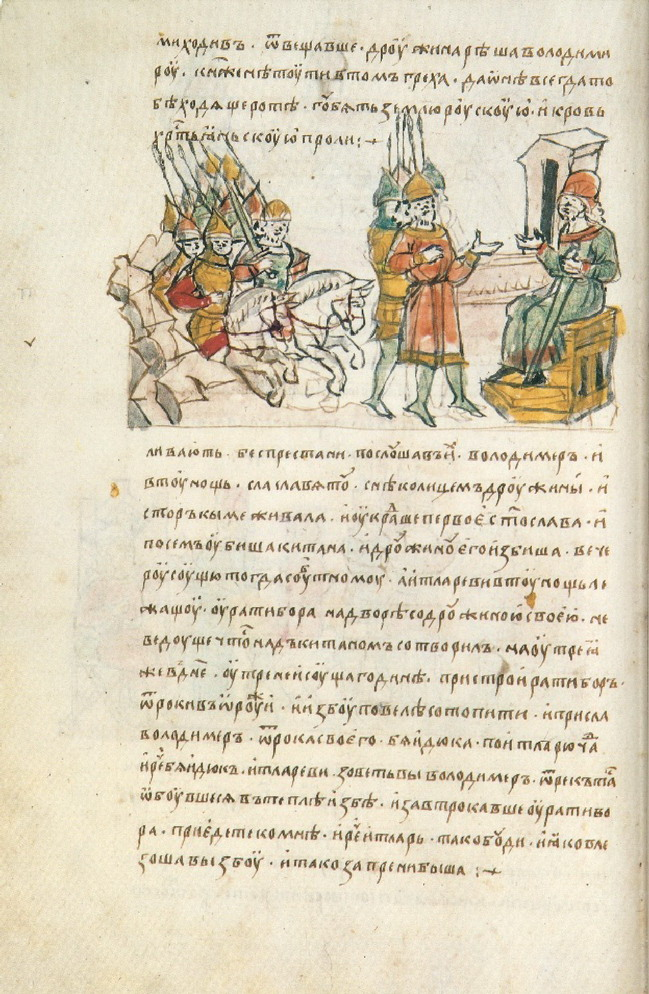
259

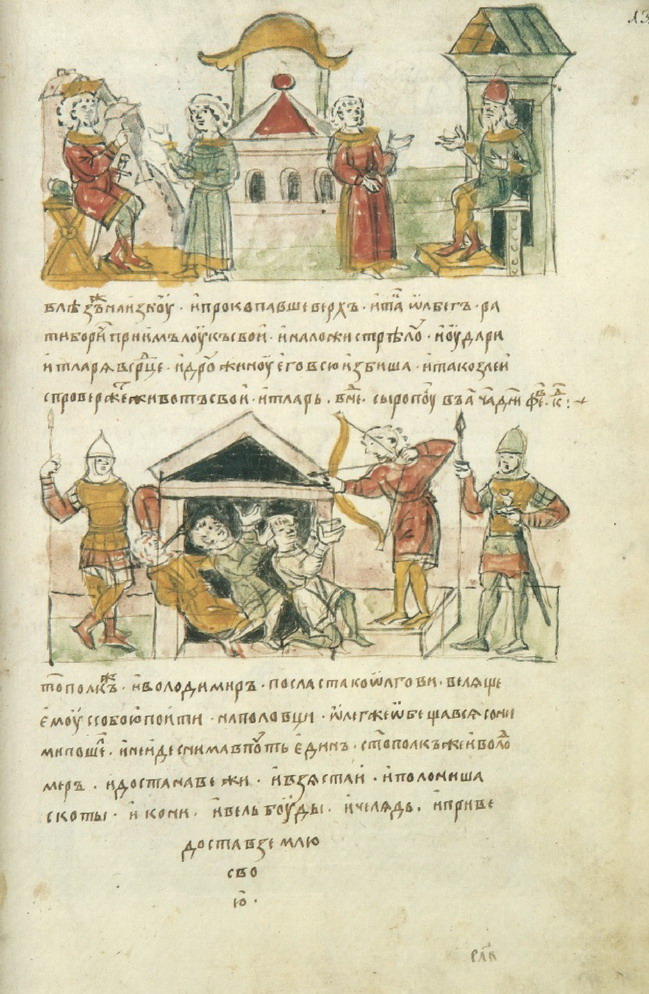
260

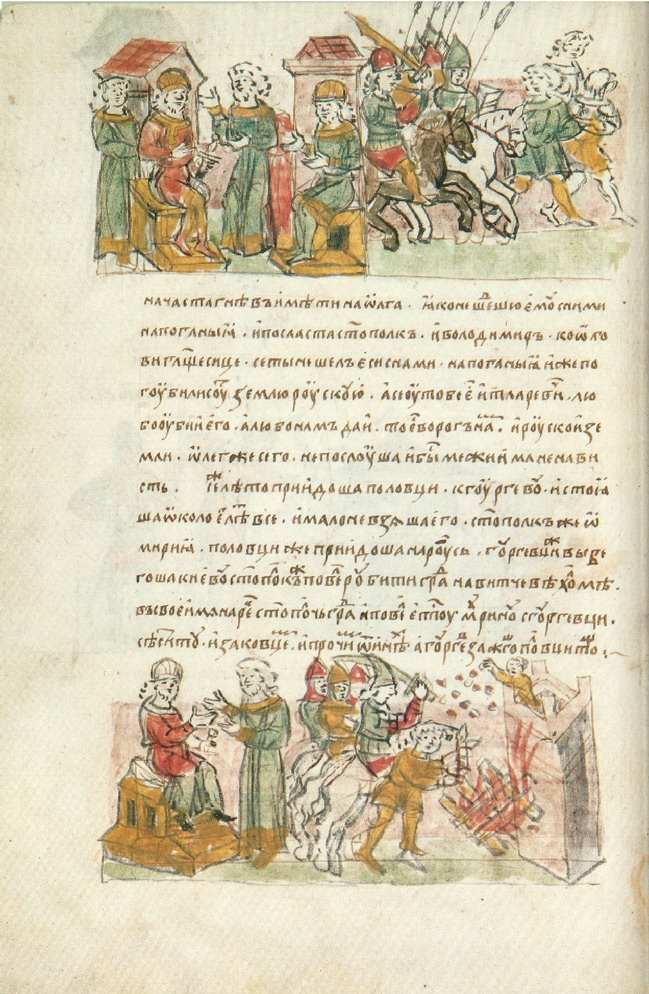
261

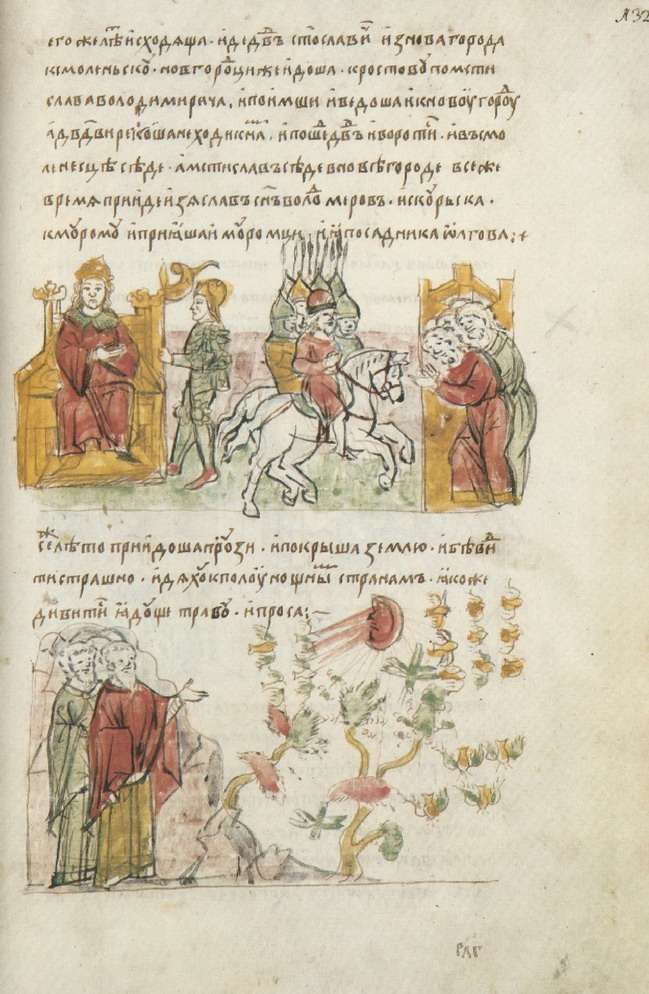
262

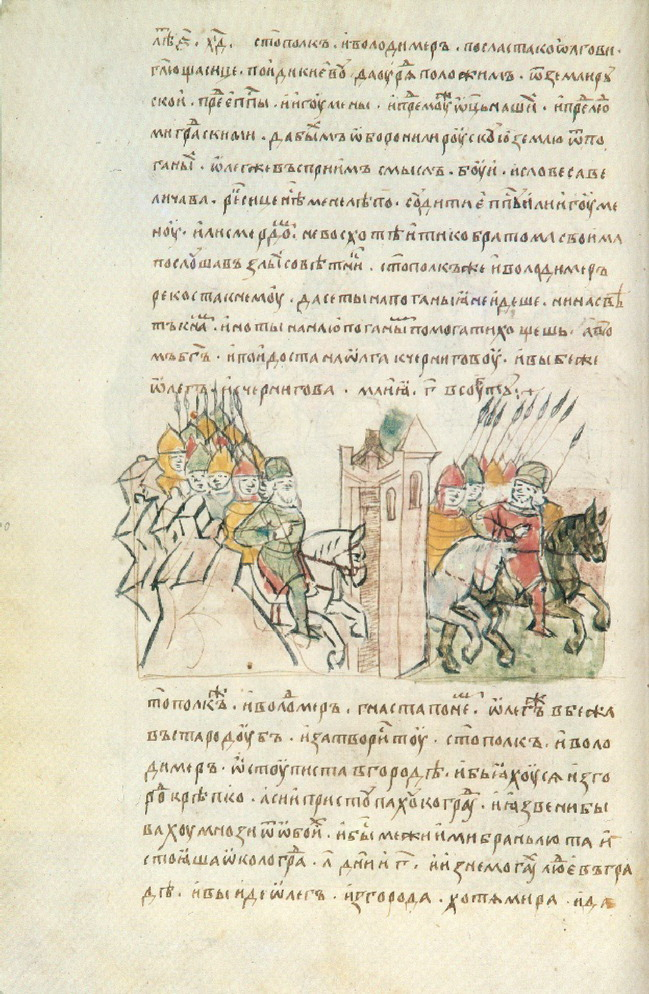
263

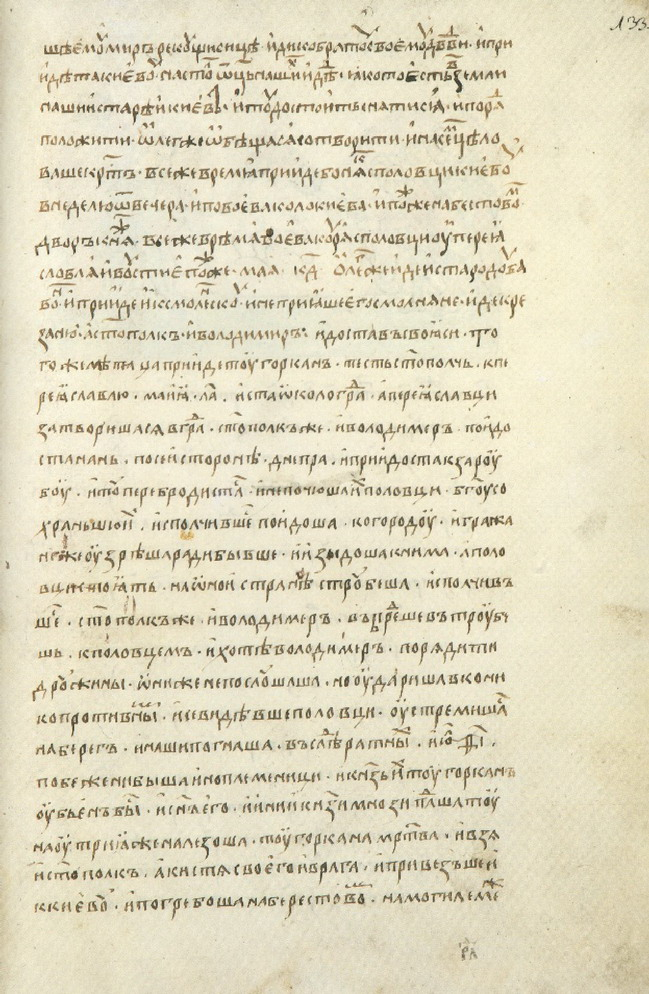
264

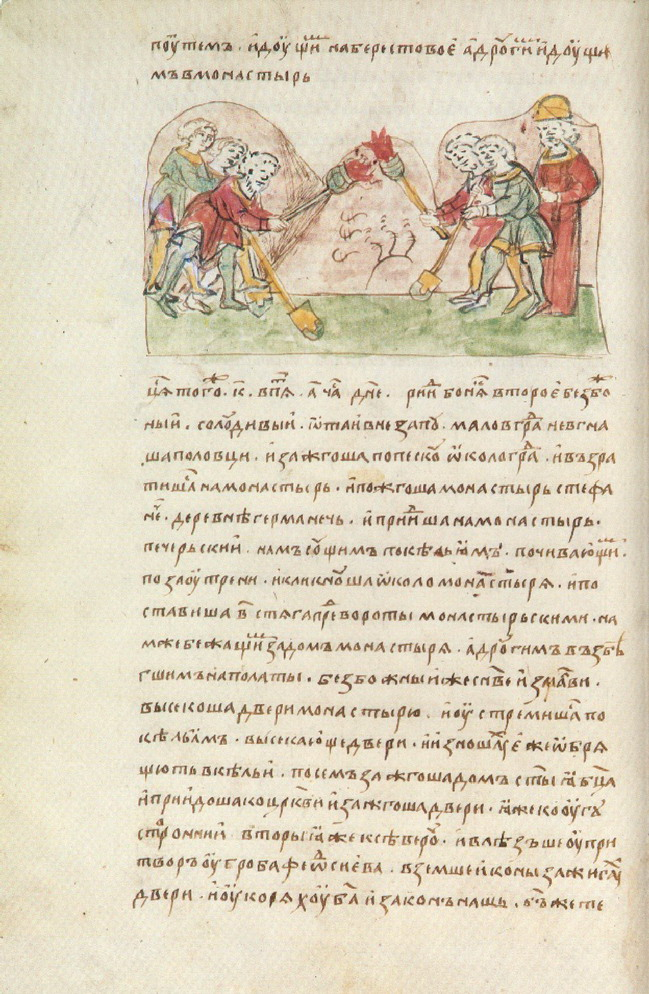
265

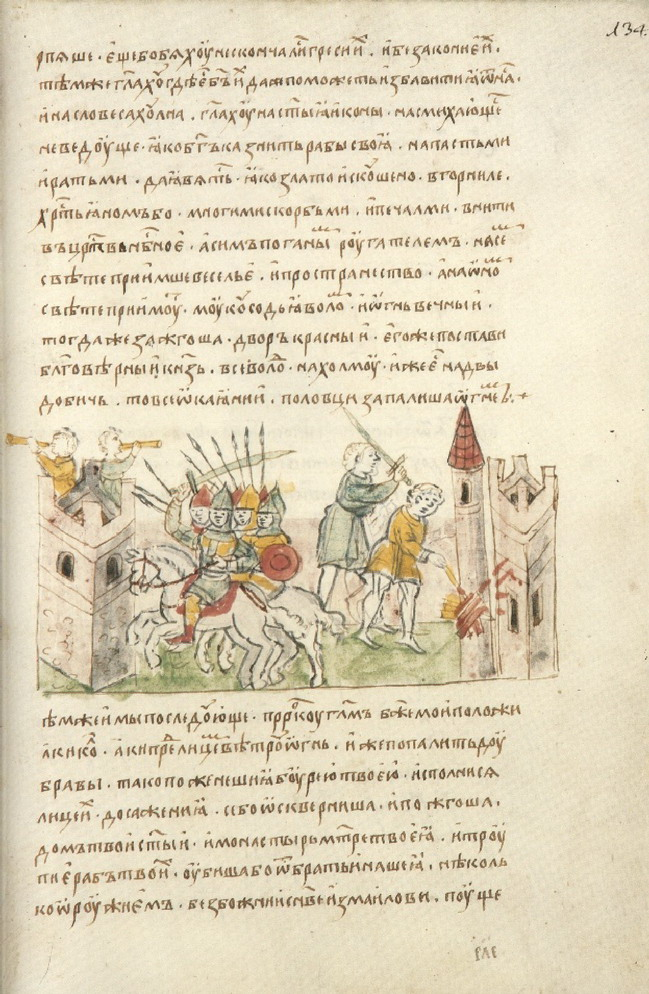
266

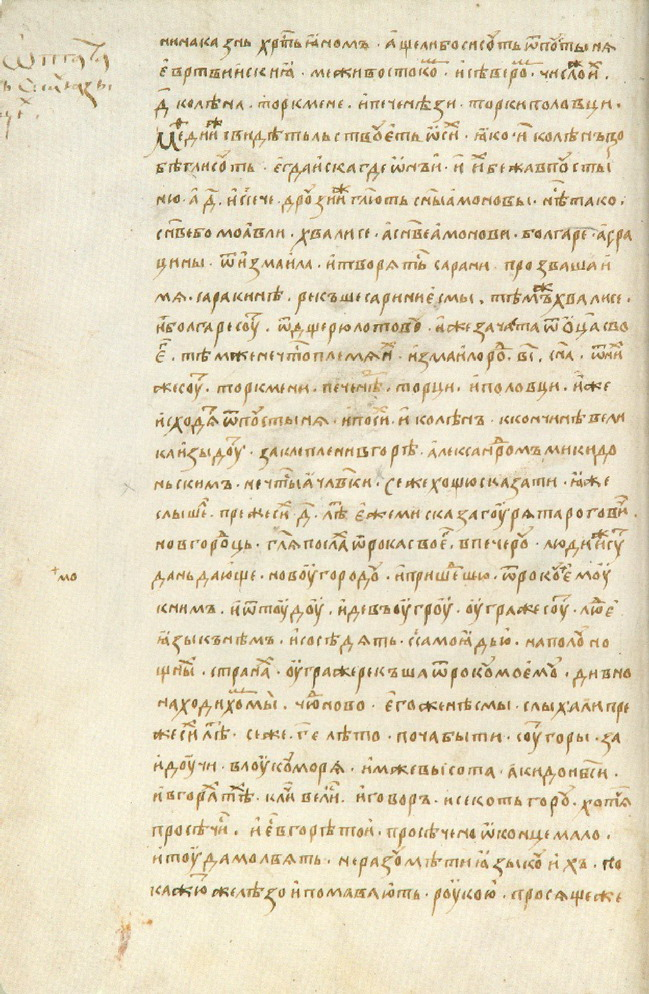
267

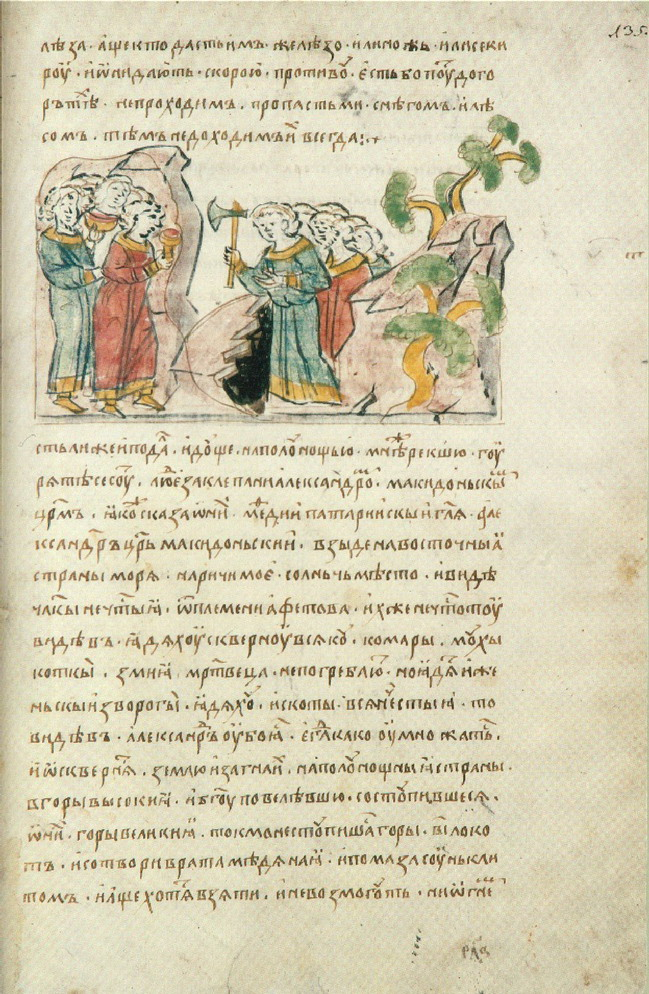
268

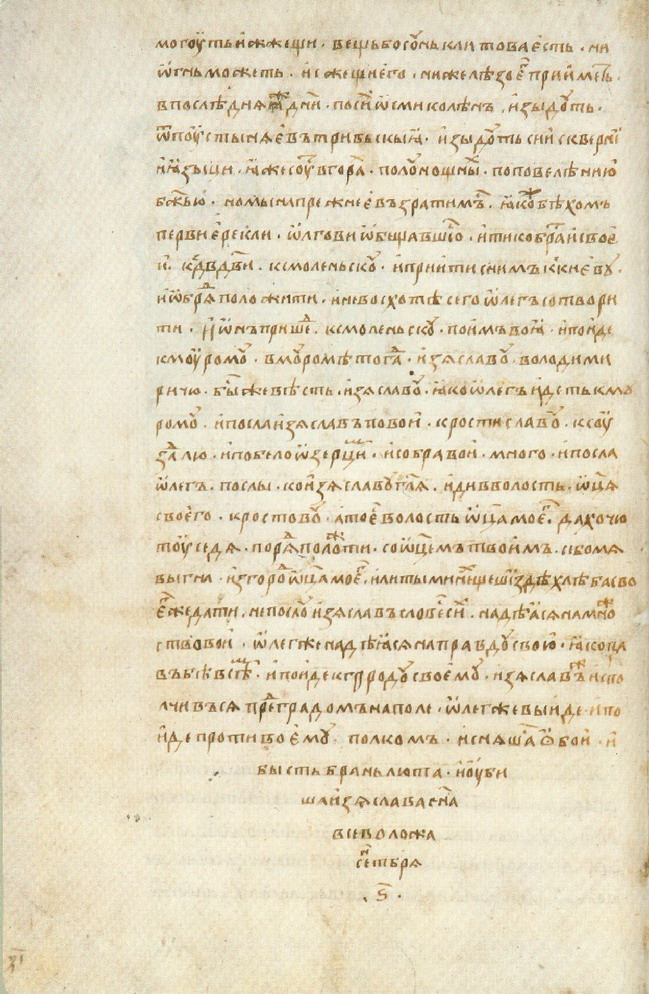
269

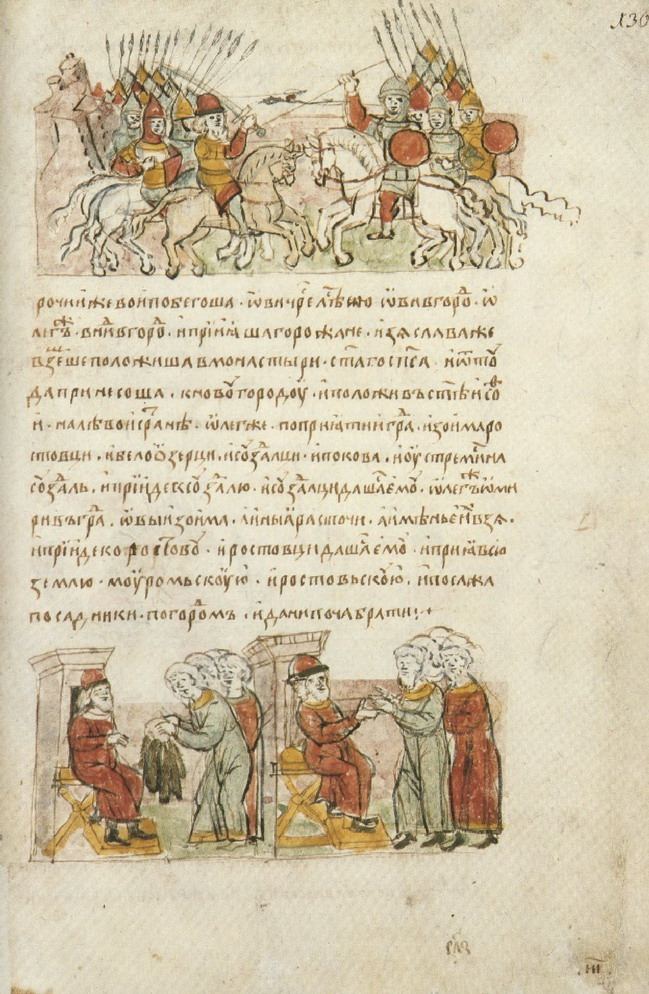
270

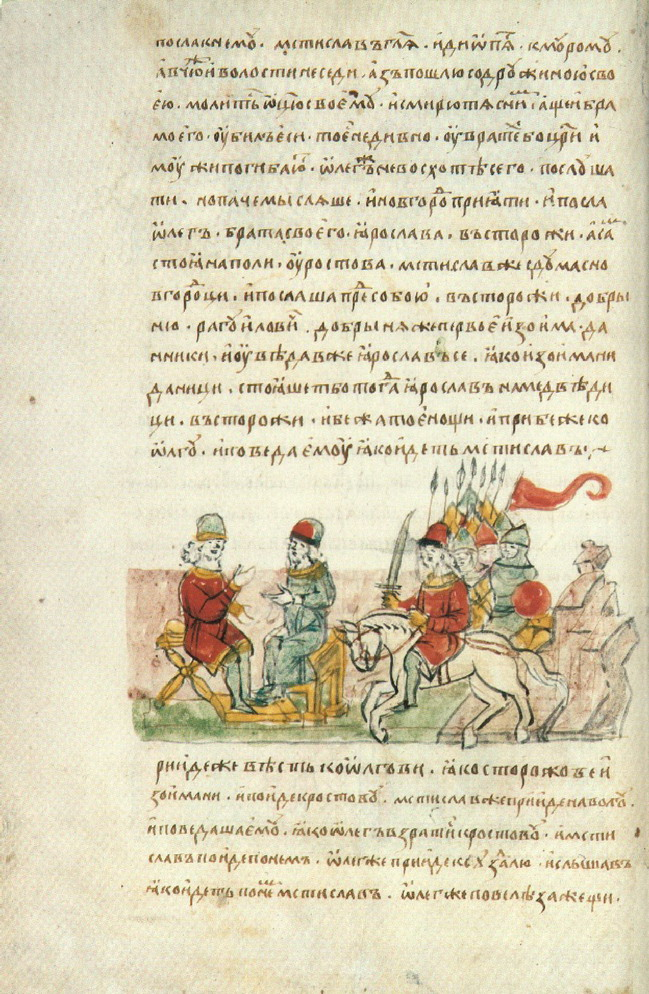
271

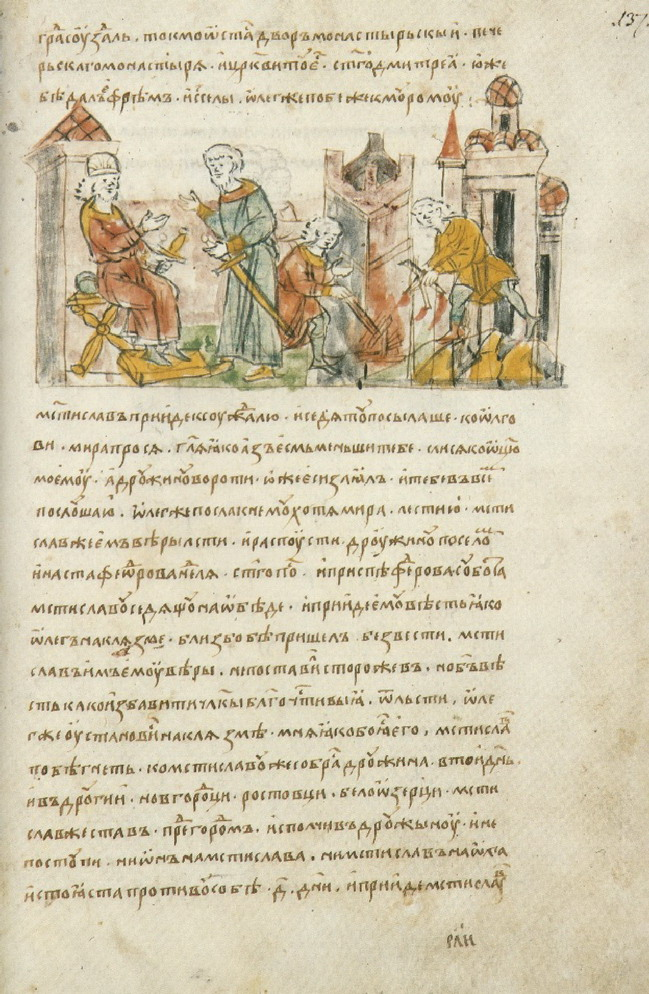
272

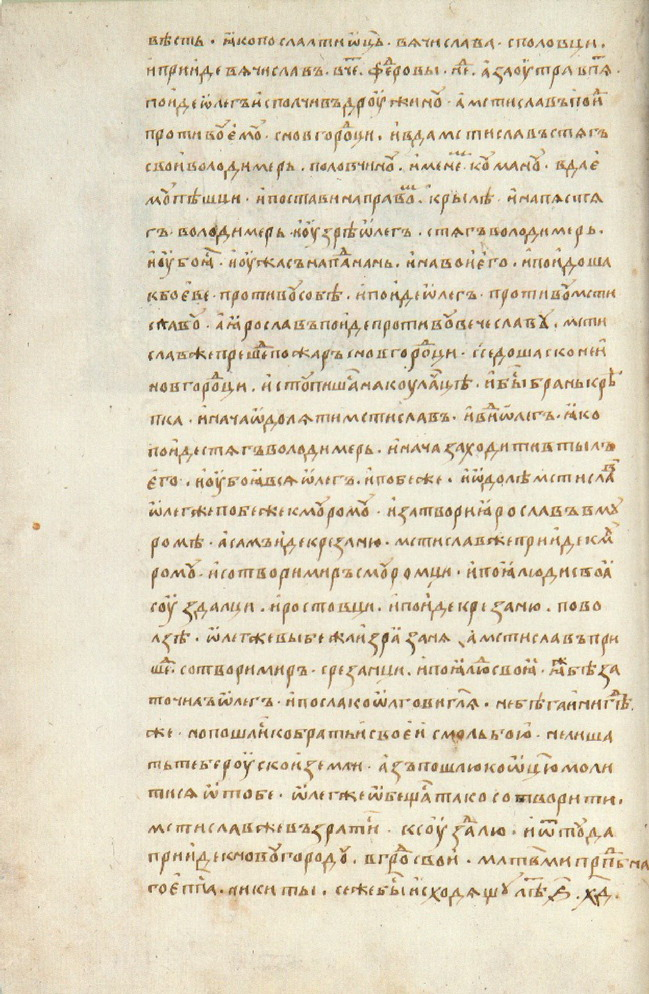
273

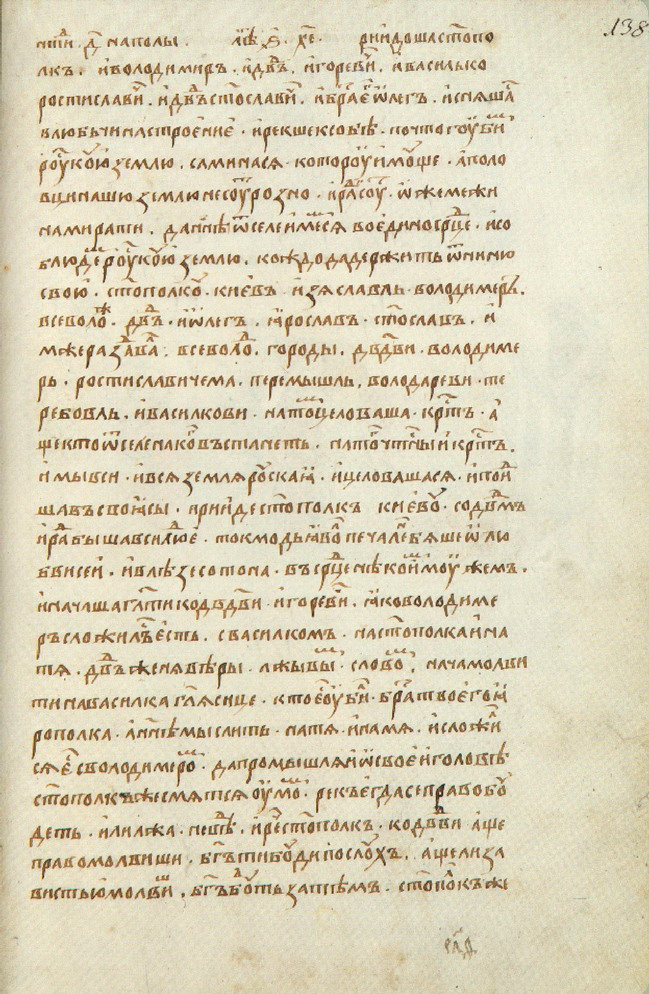
274

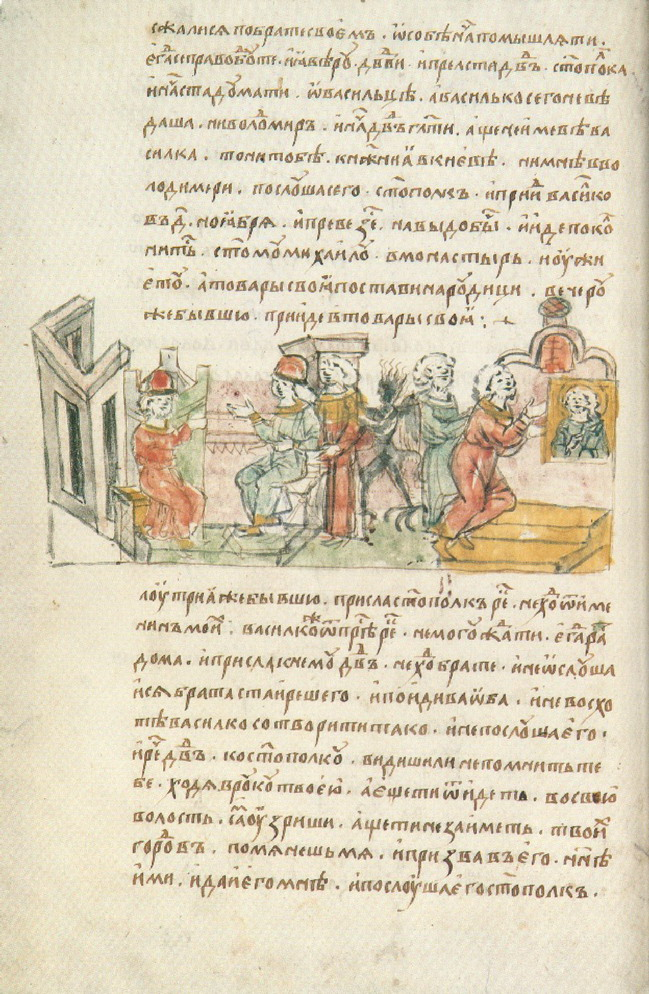
275

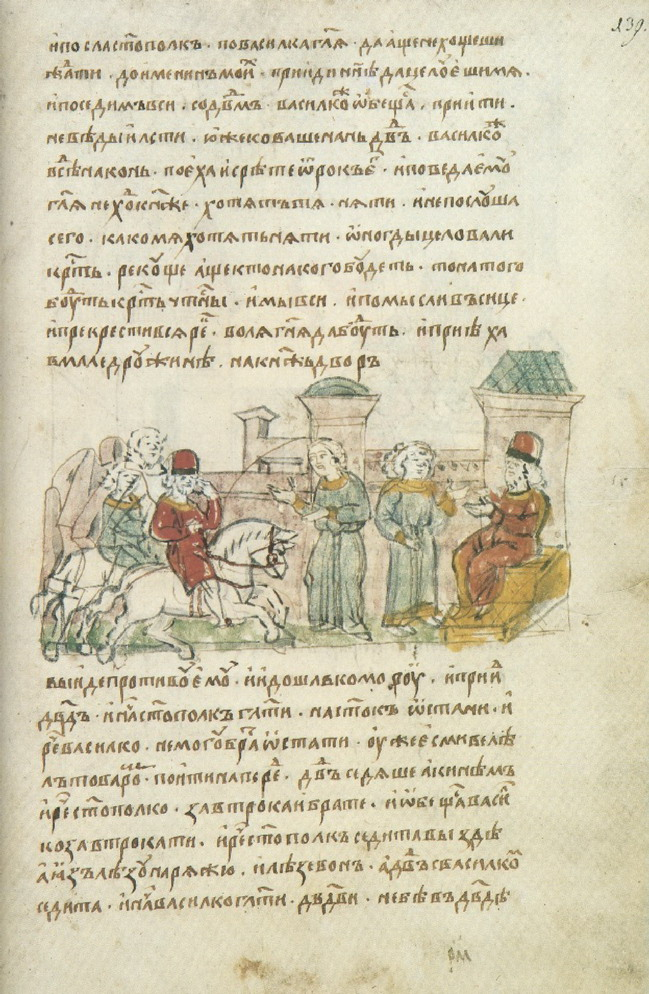
276

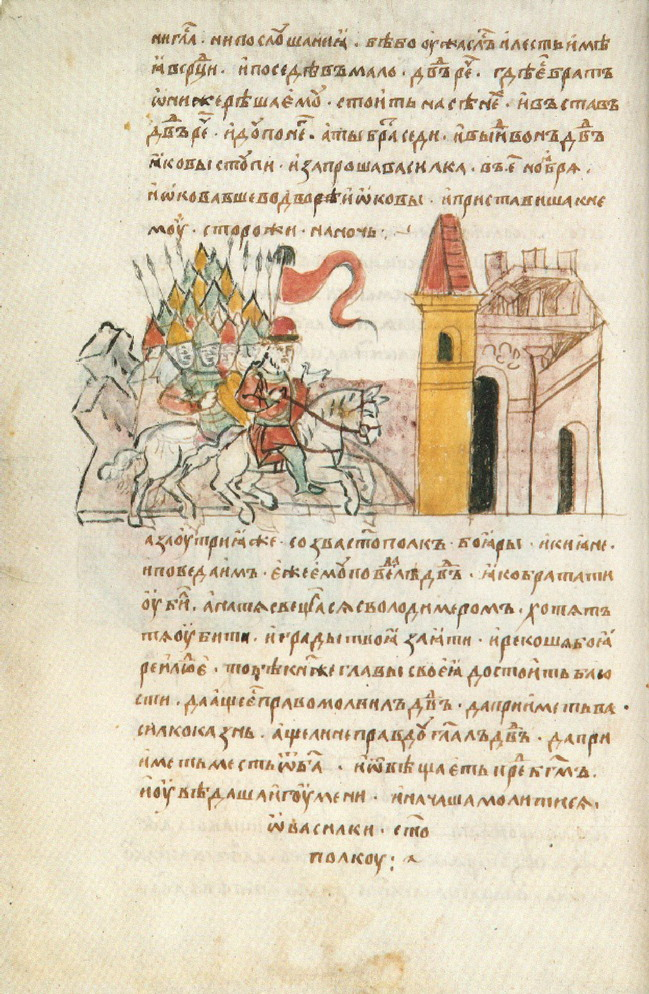
277

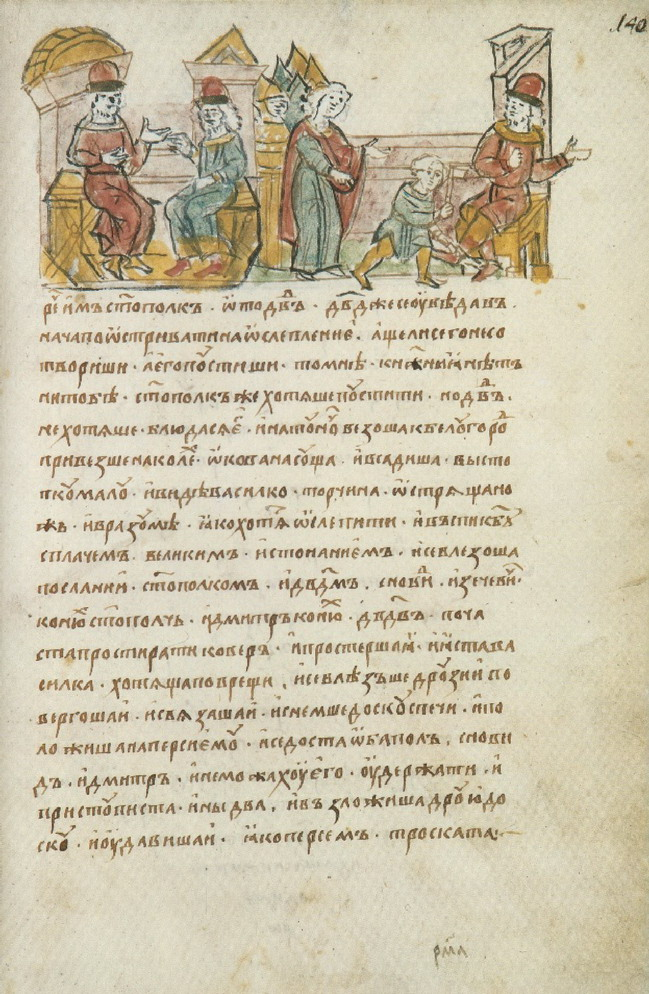
278

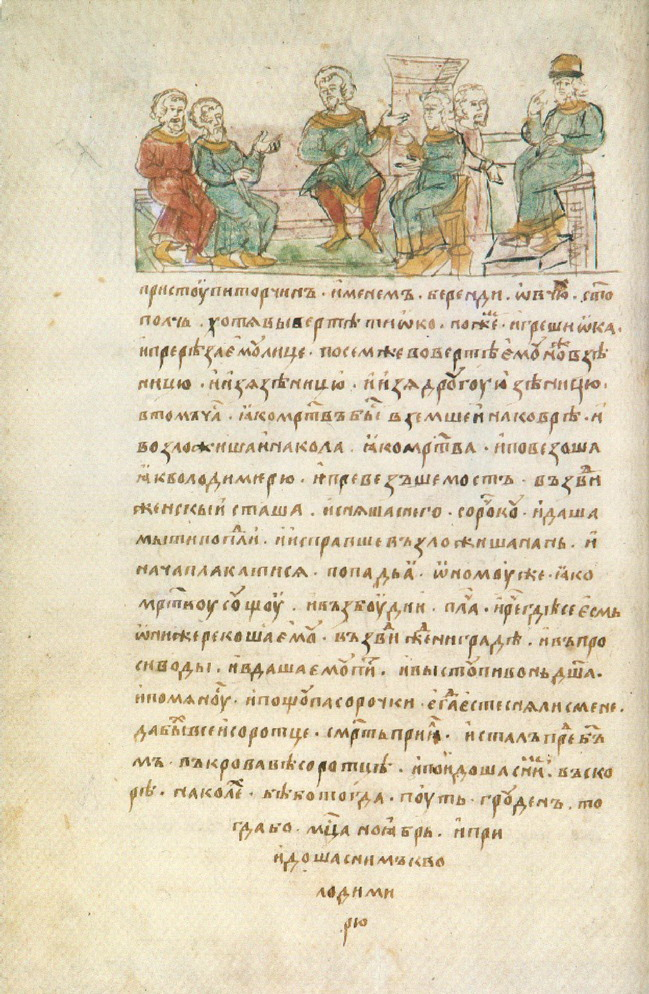
279

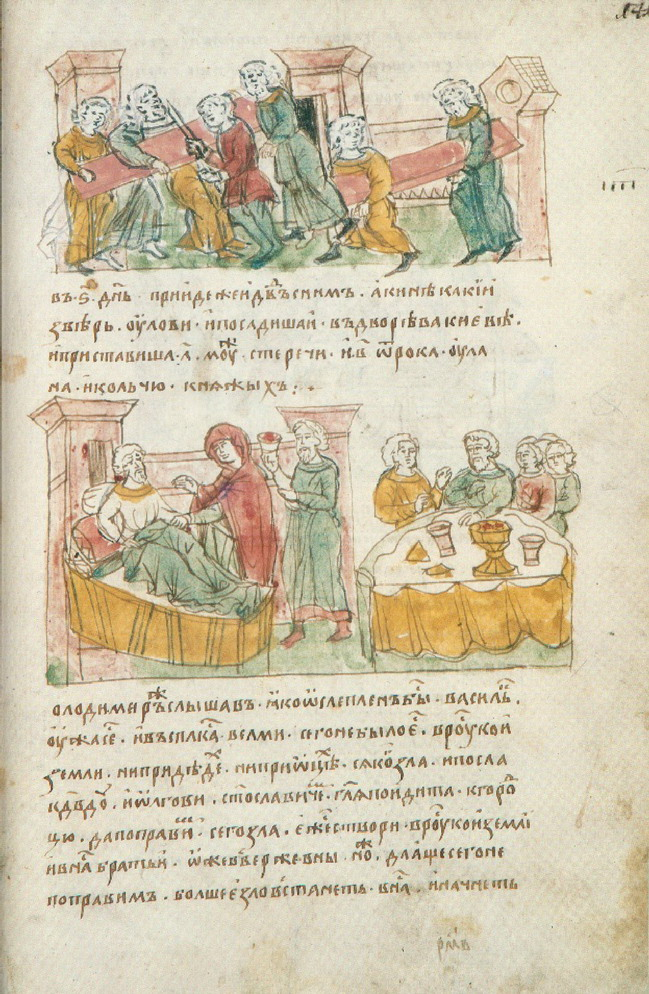
280

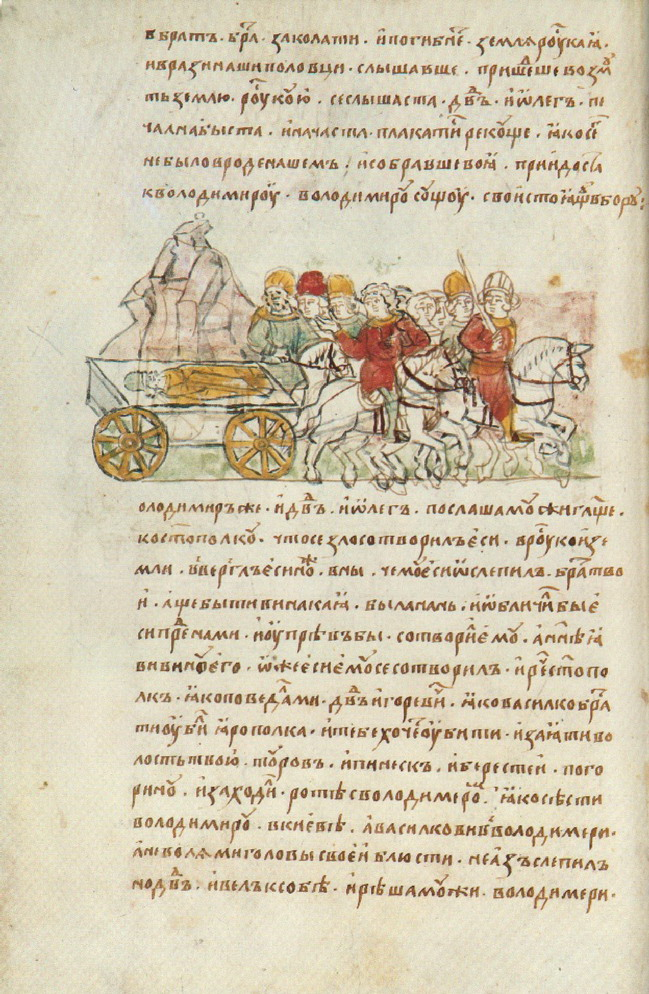
281

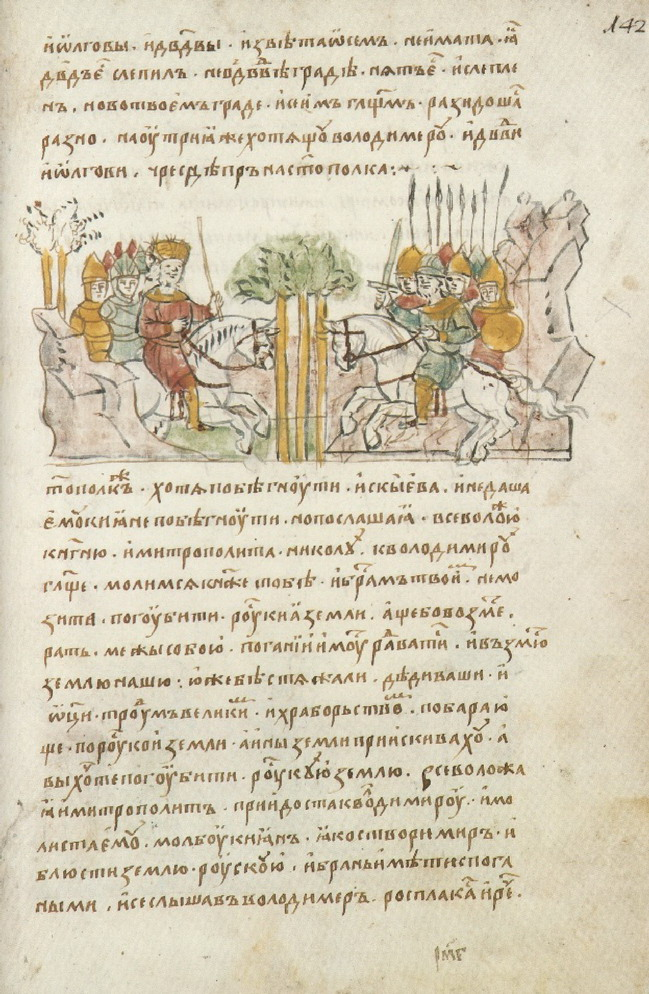
282

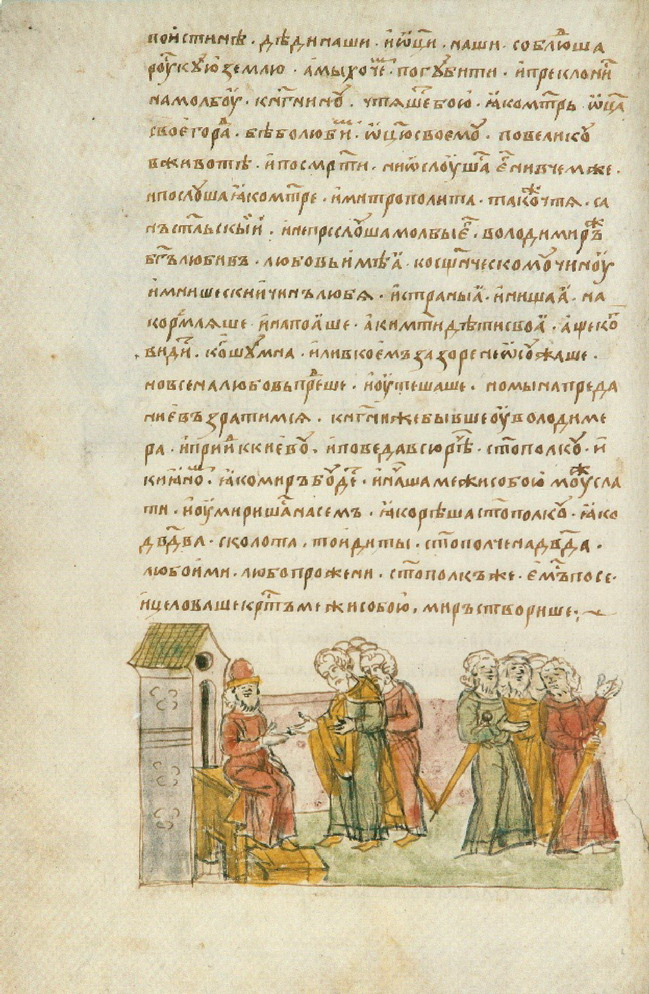
283

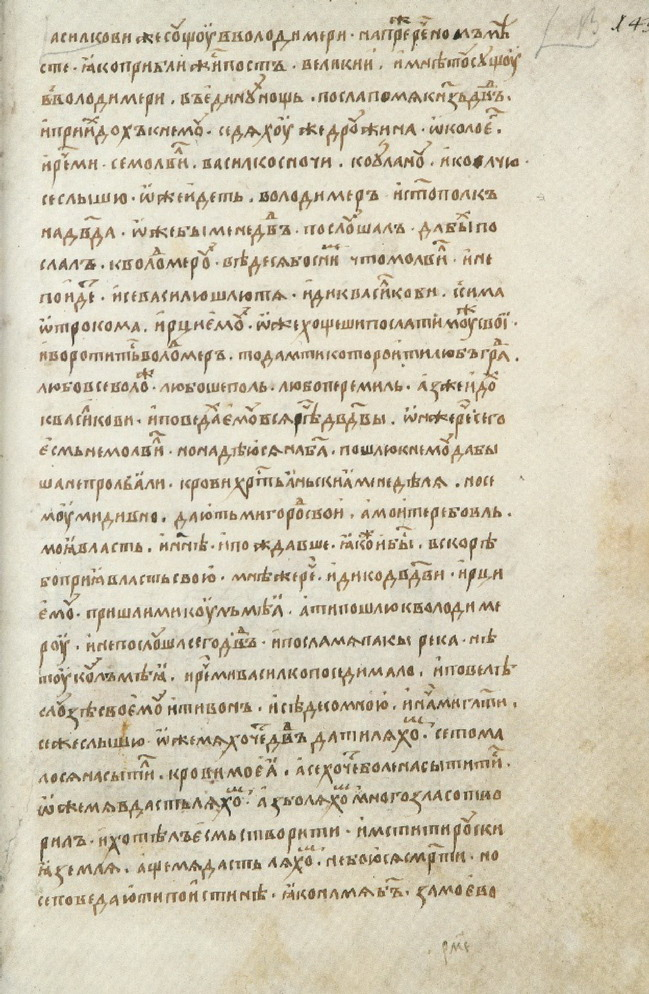
284

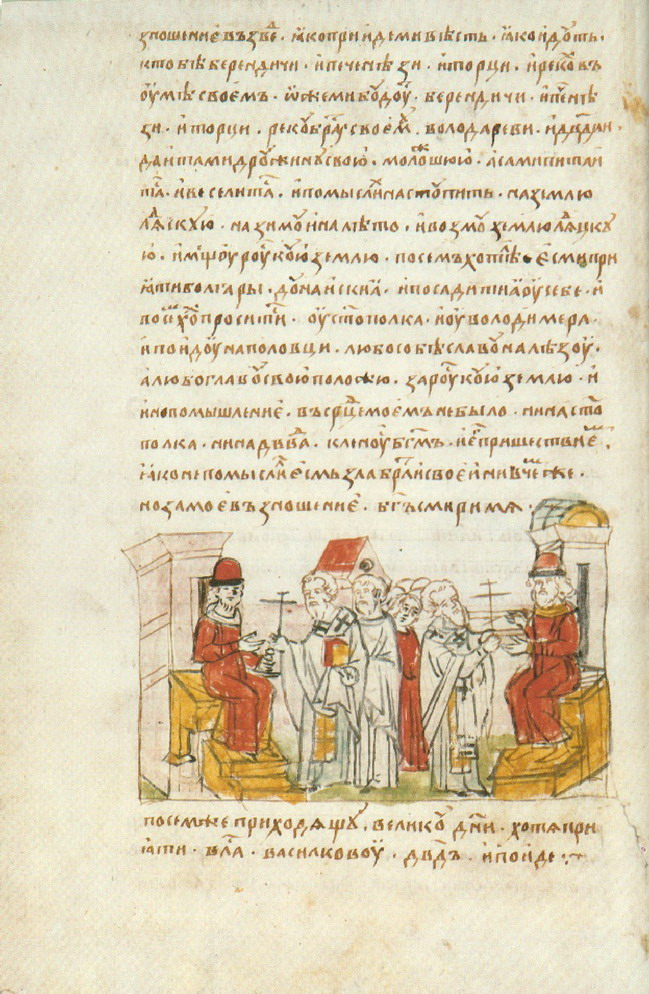
285

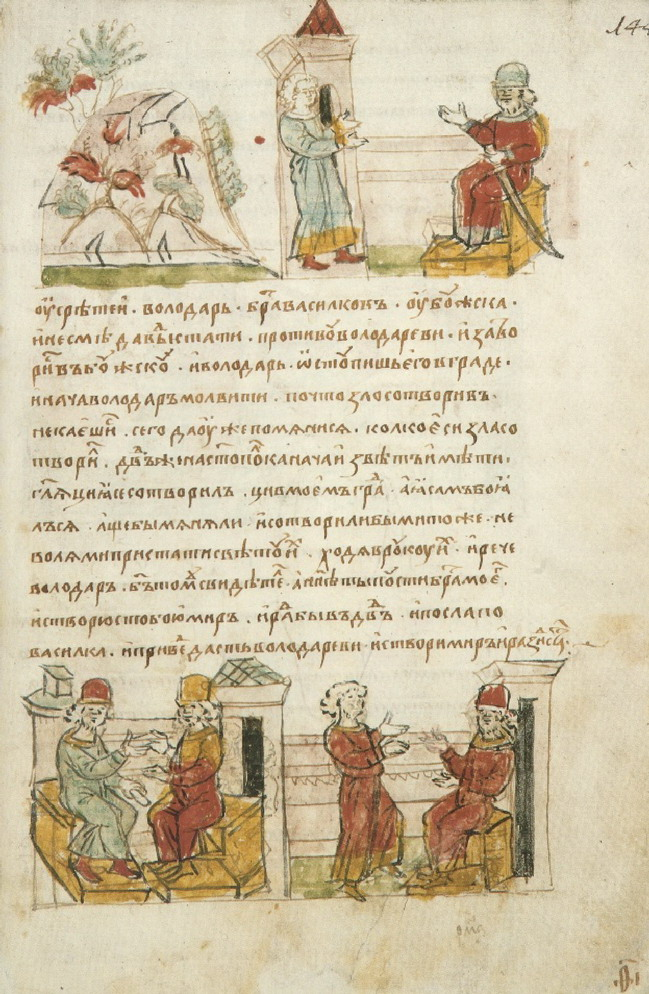
286

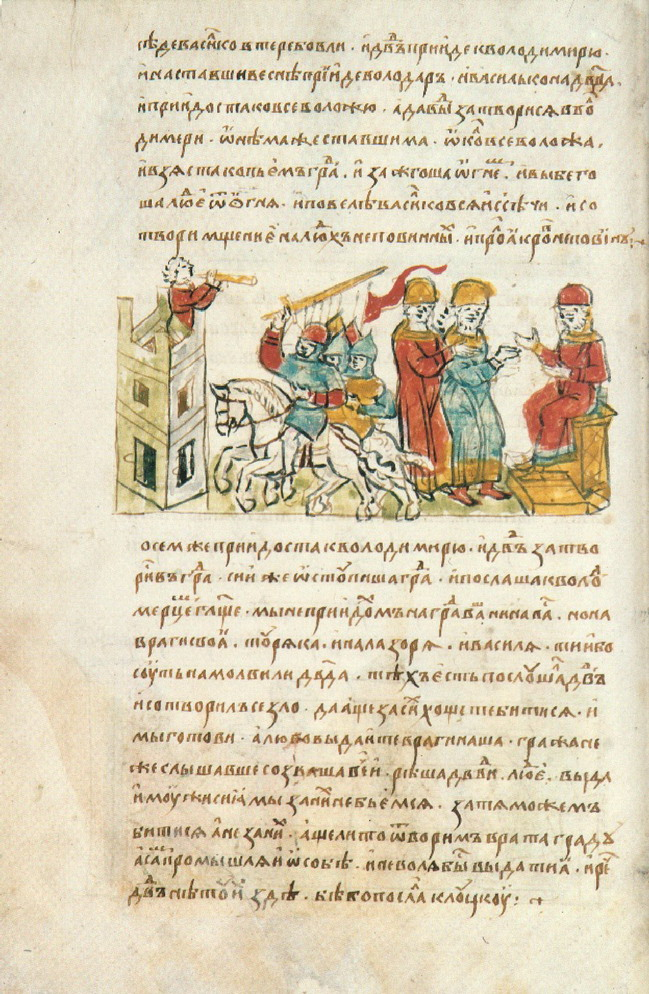
287

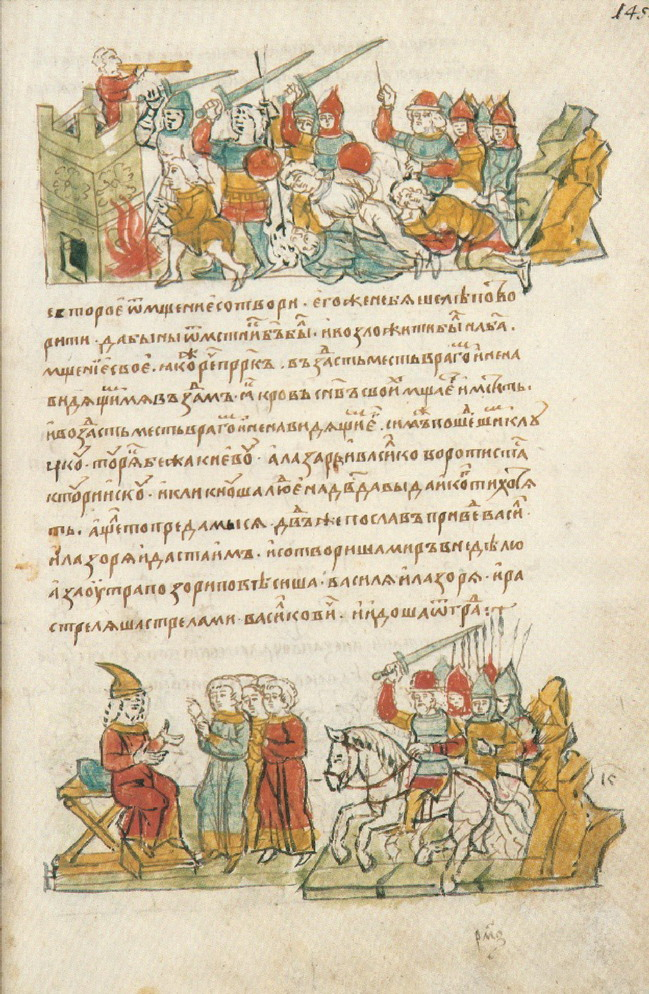
288

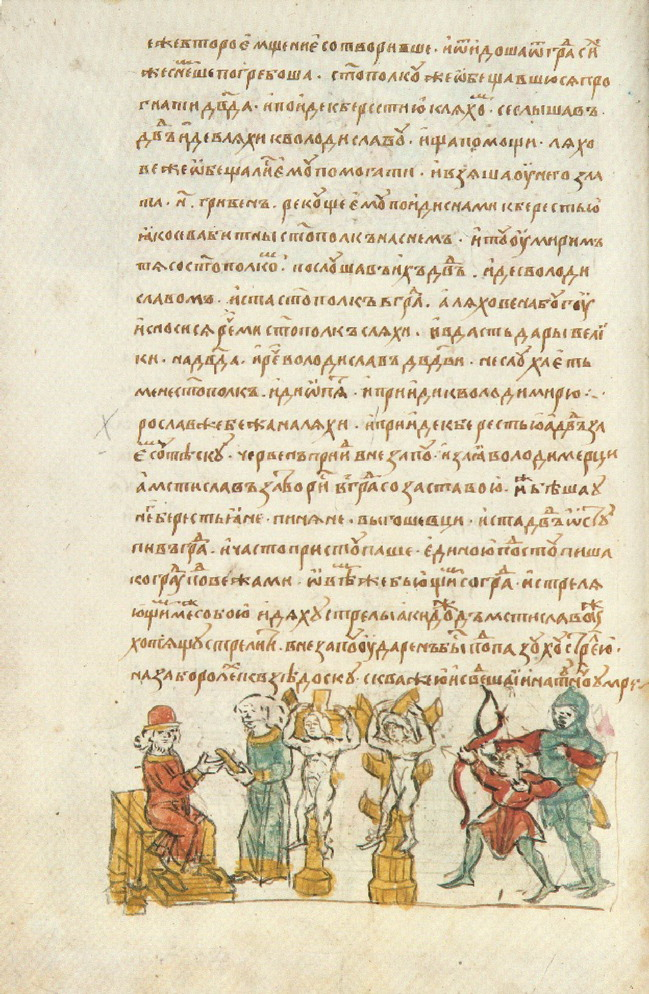
289

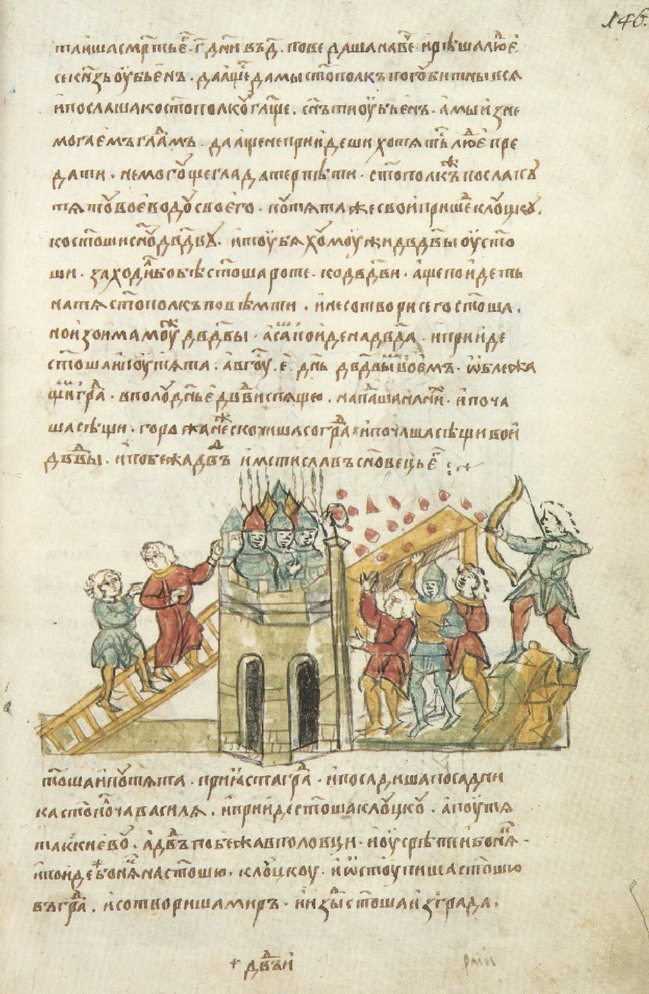
290

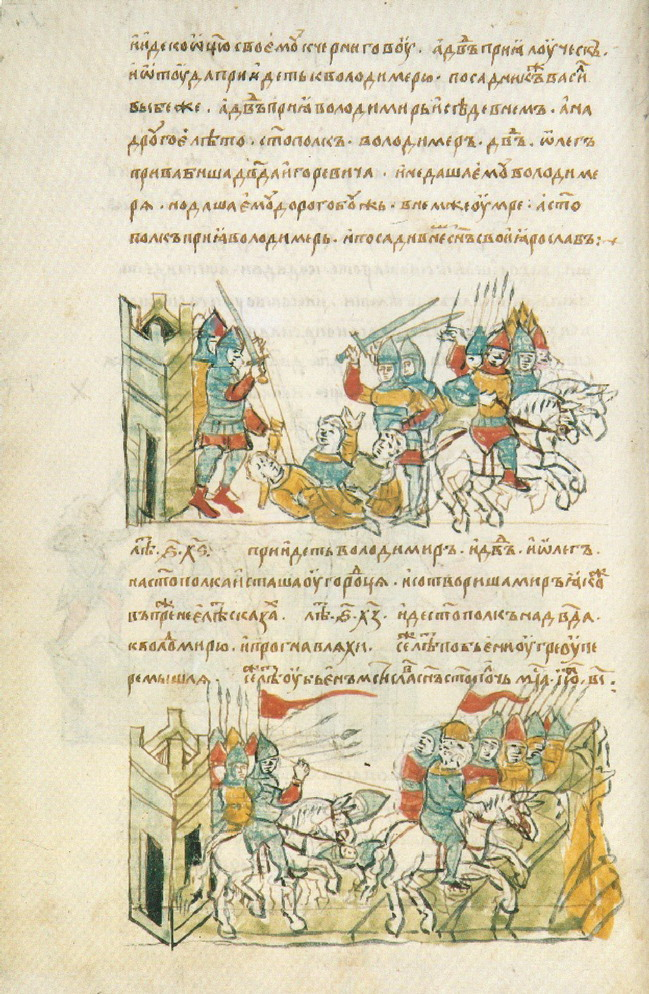
291

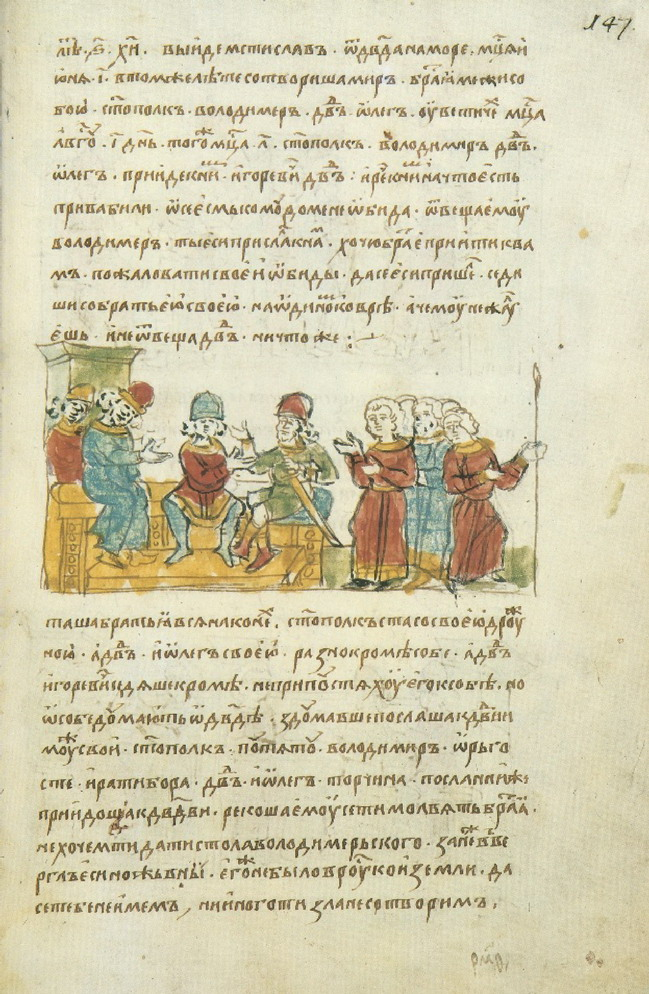
292

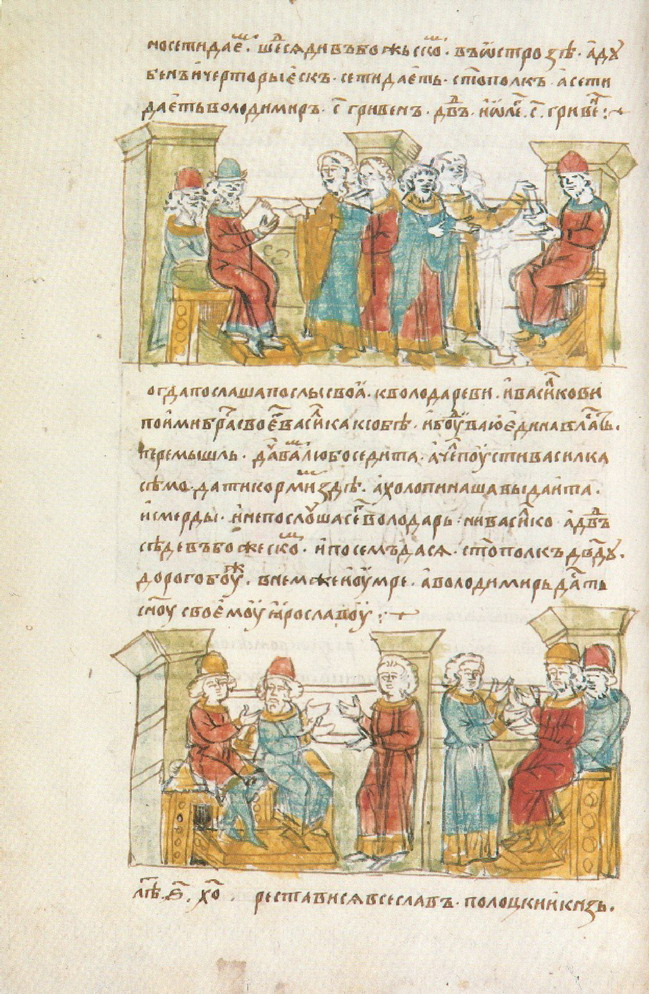
293

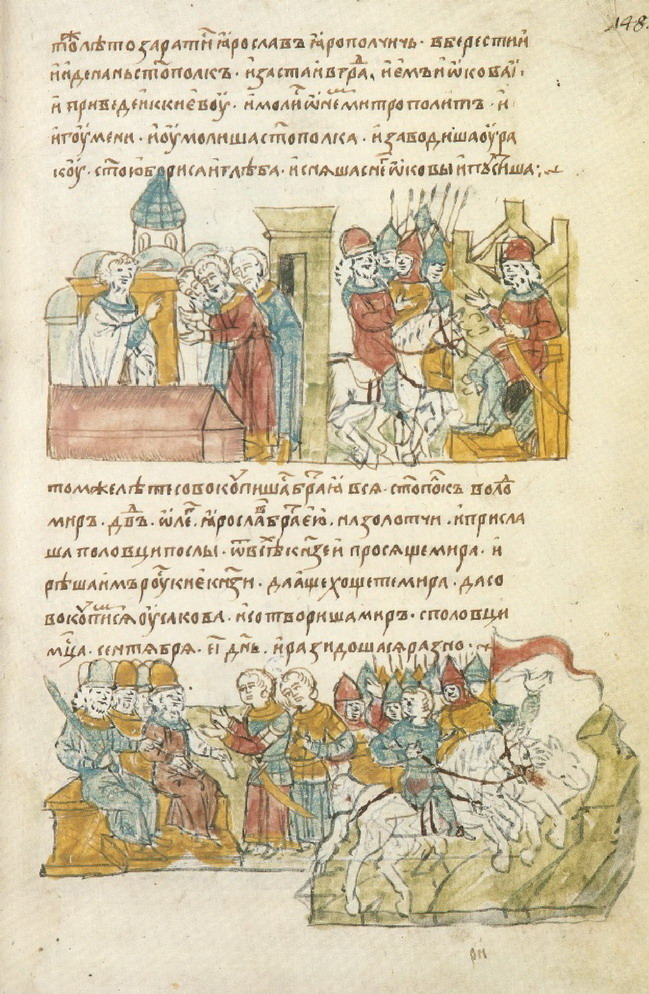
294

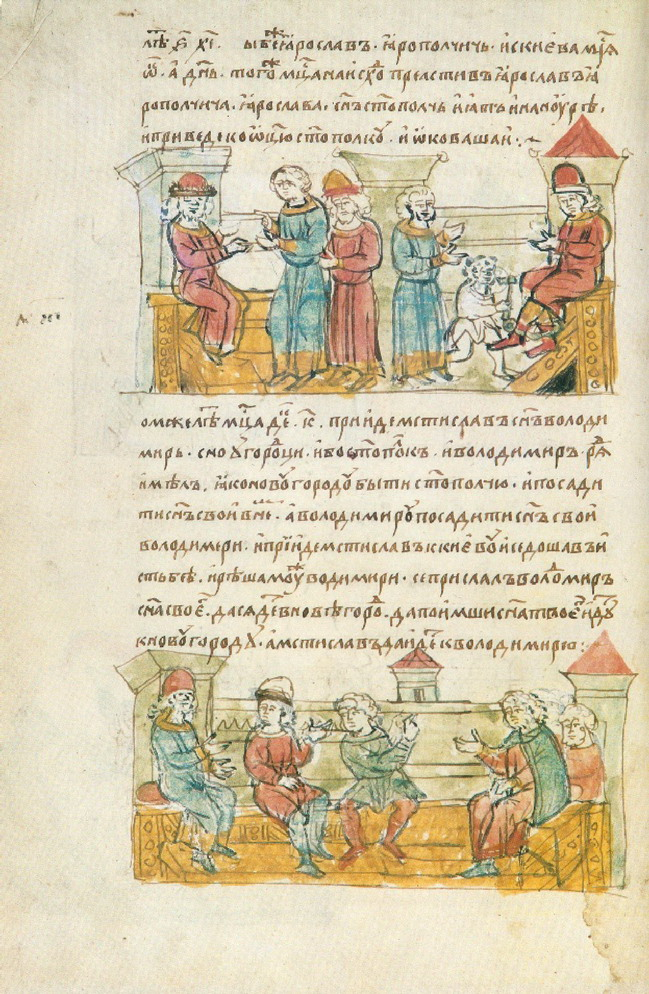
295

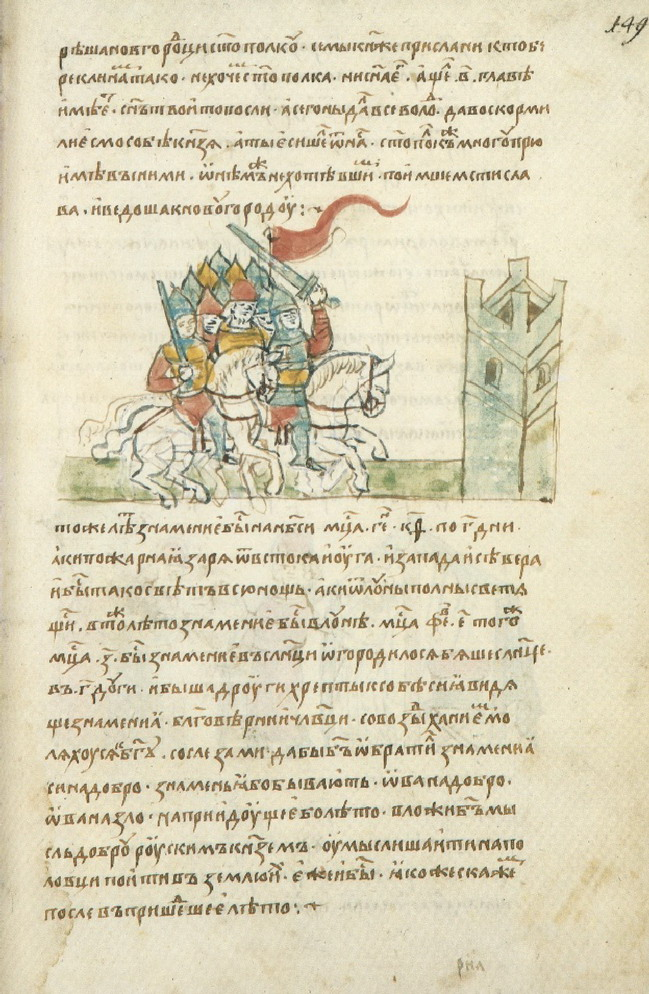
296

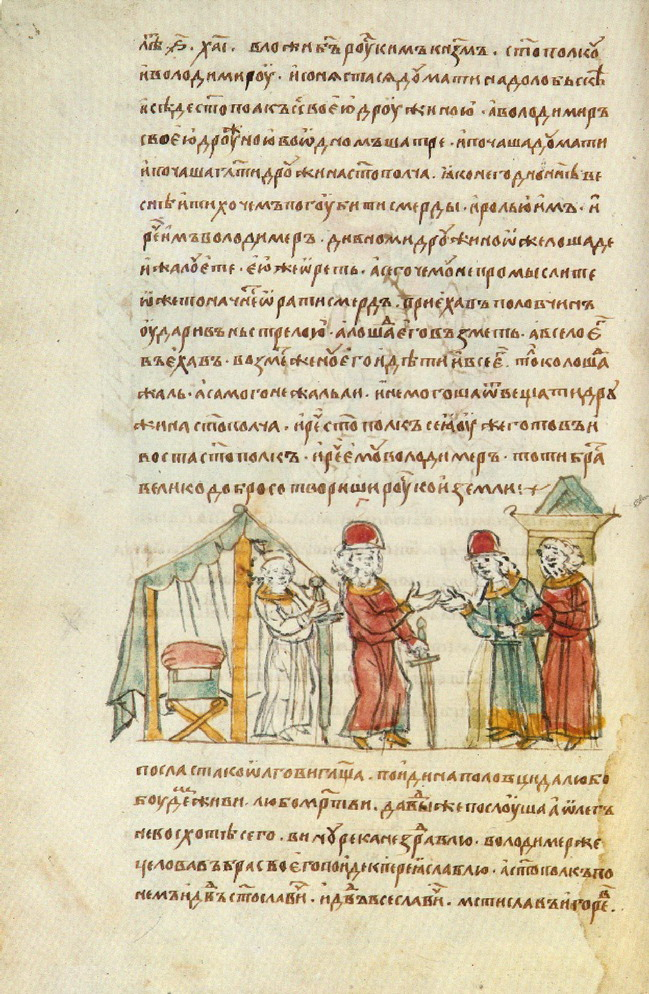
297

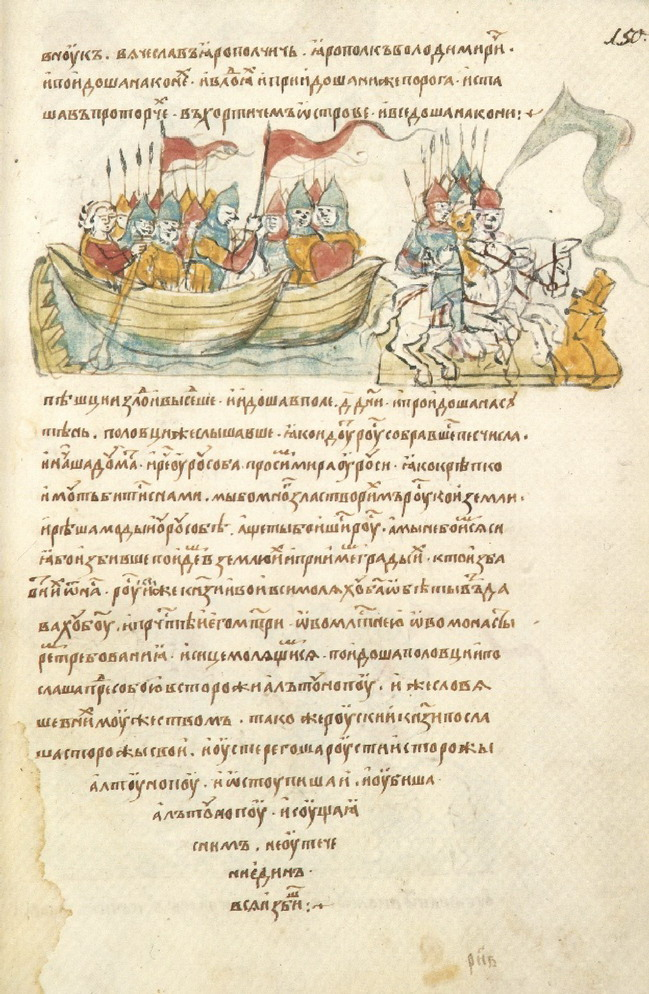
298

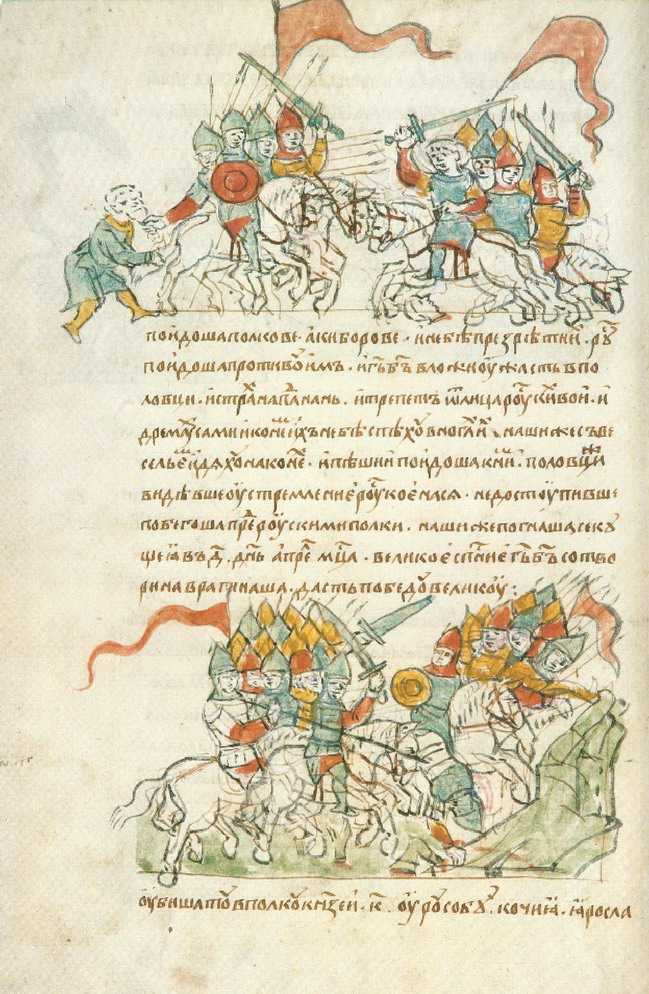
299

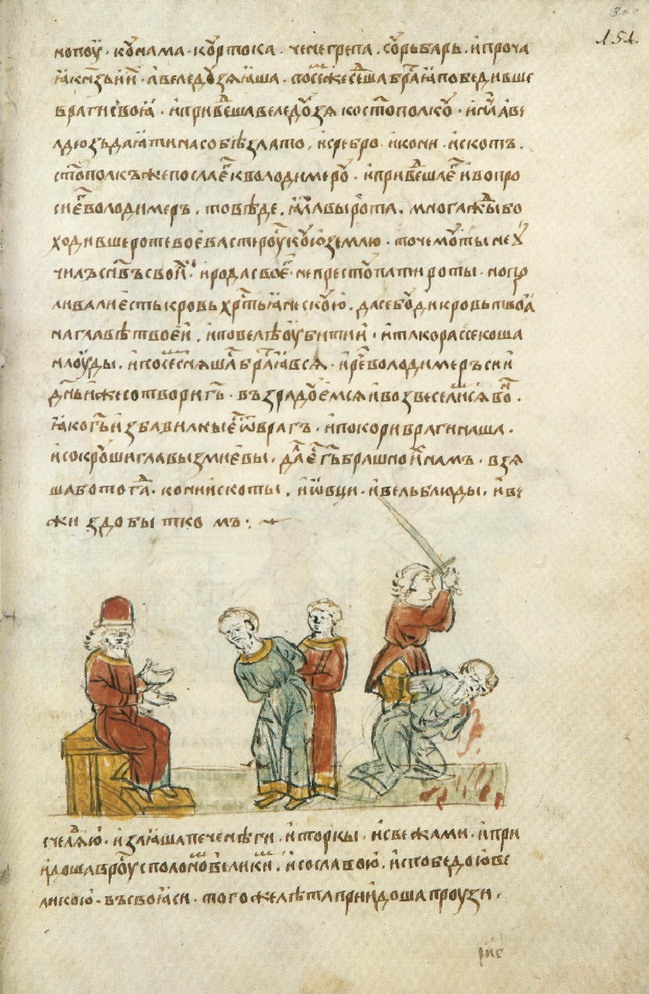
300

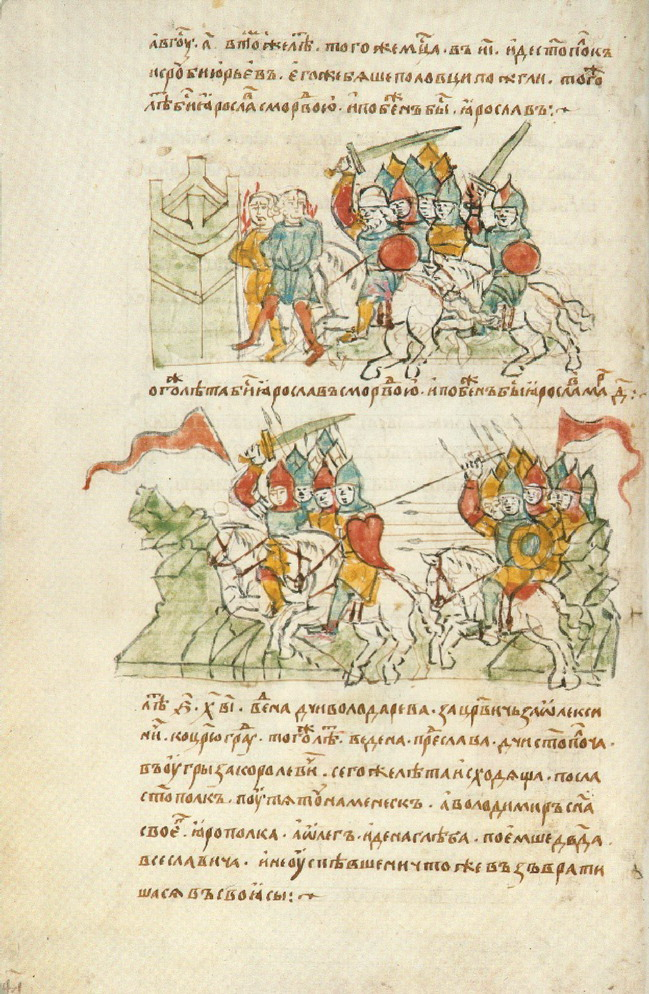
301

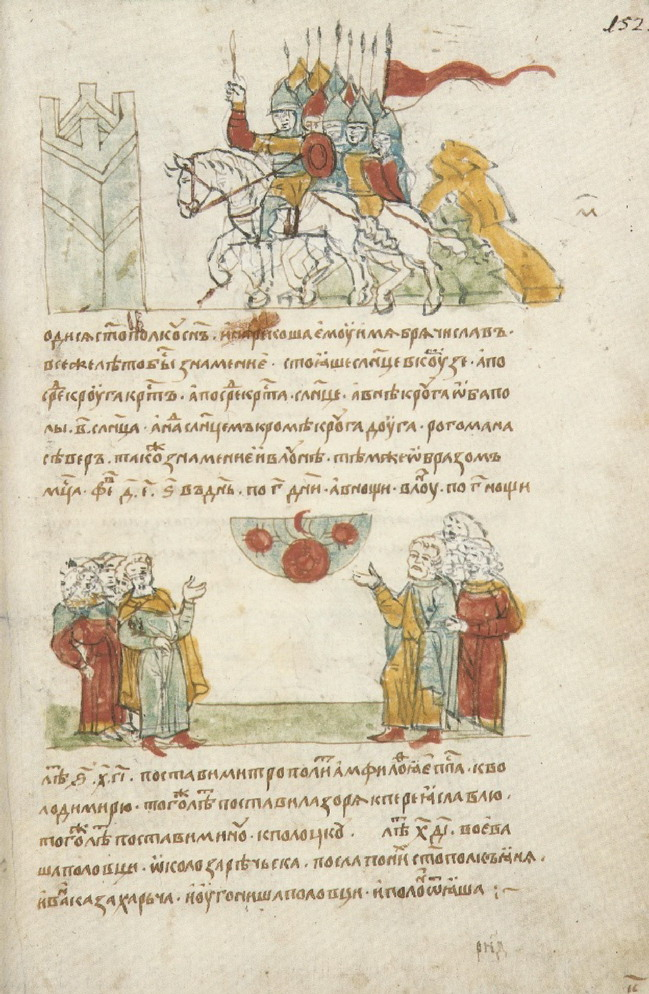
302

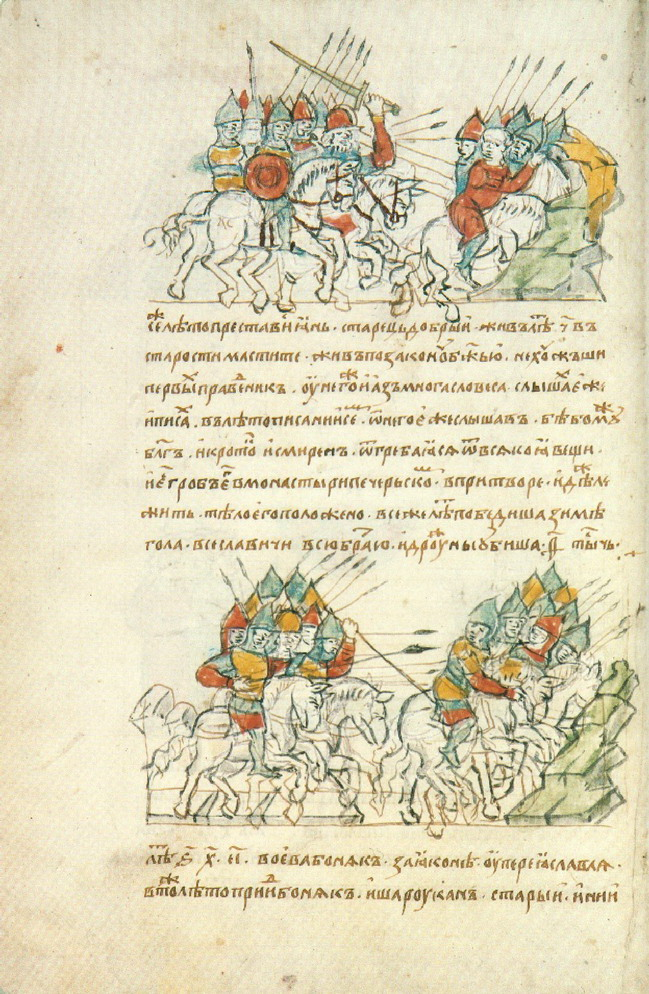
303

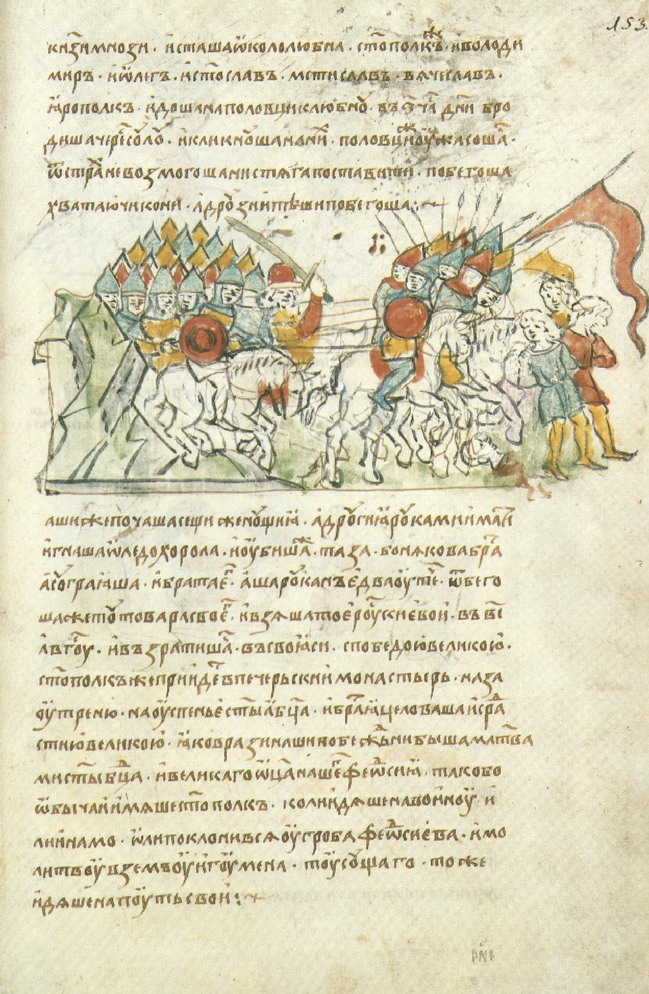
304

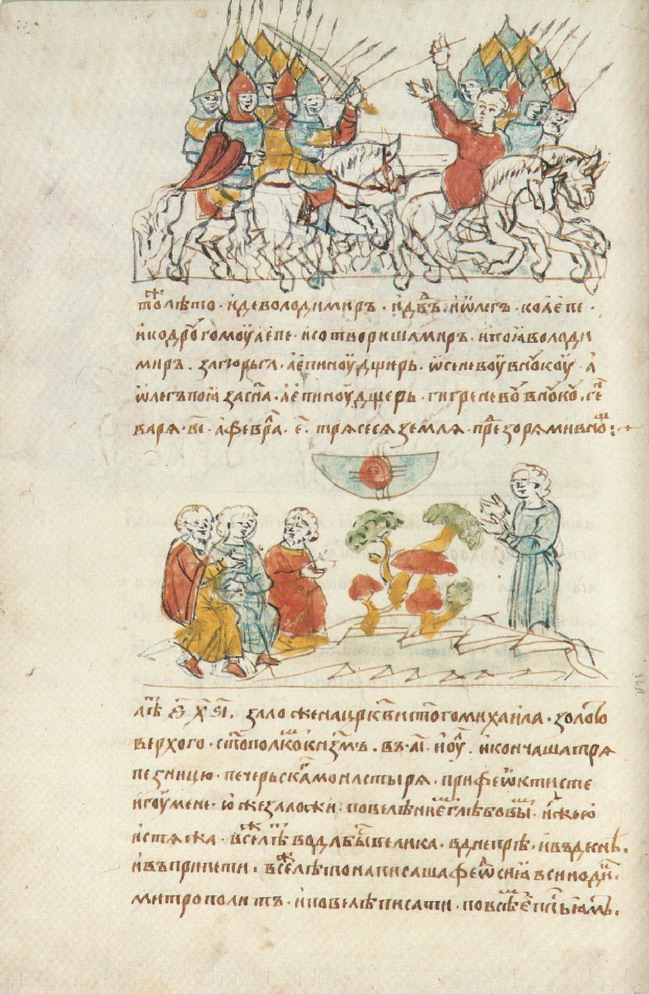
305

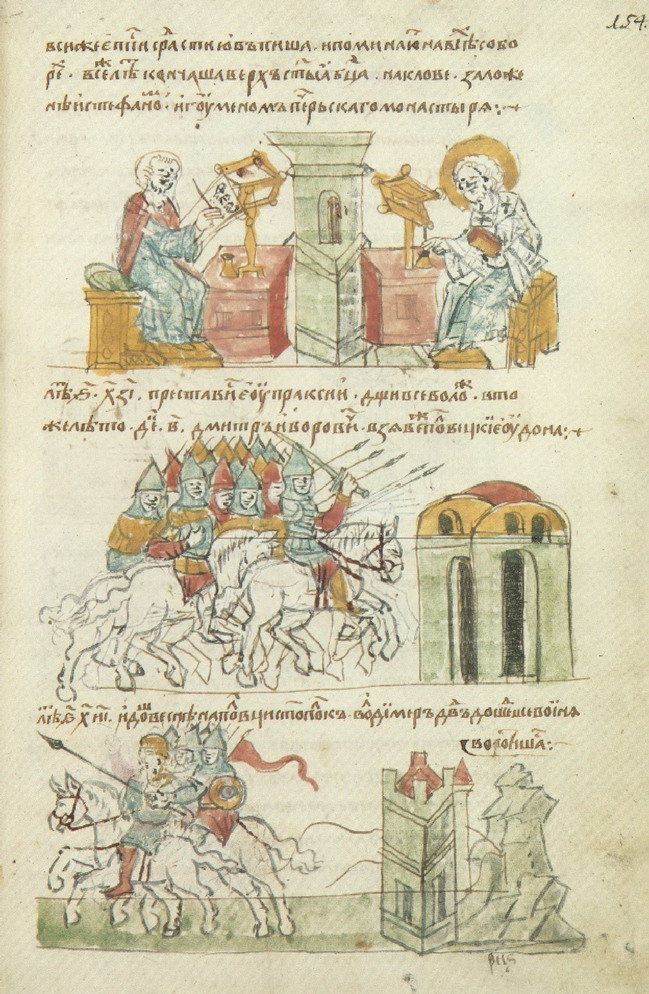
306

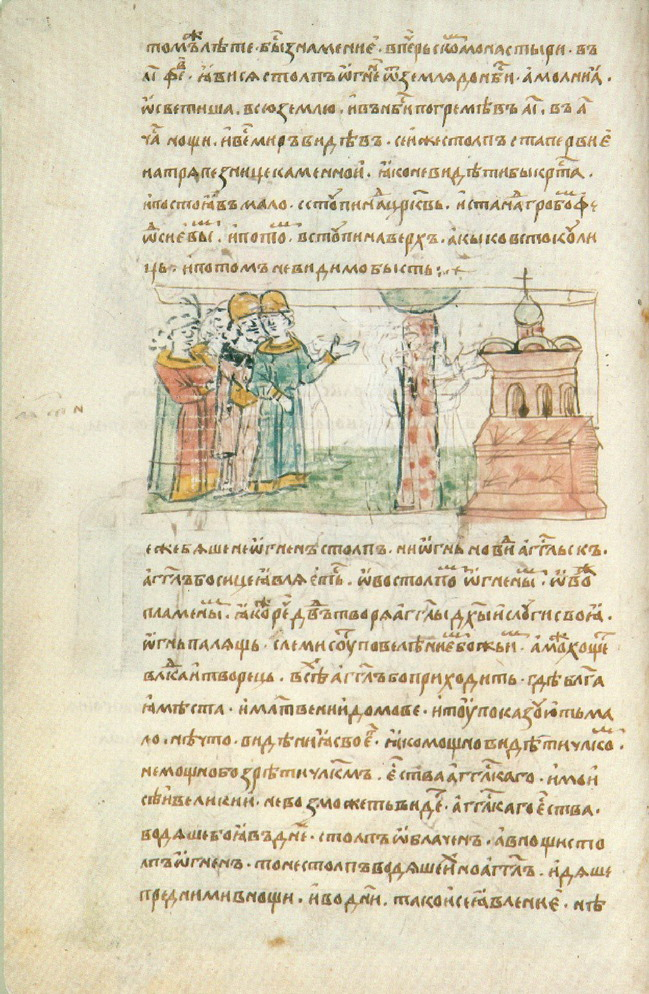
307

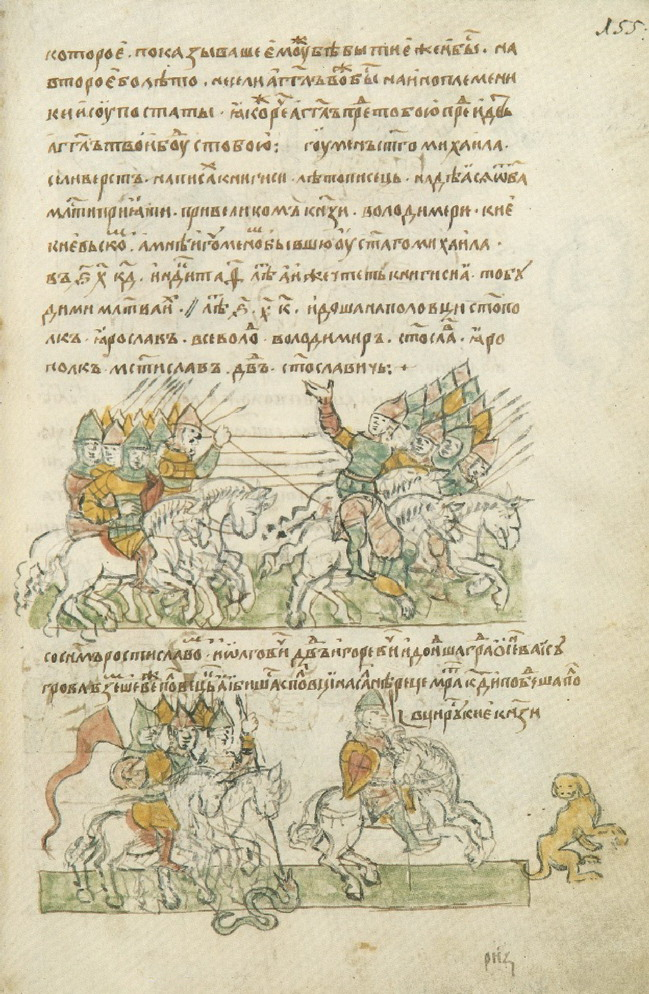
308

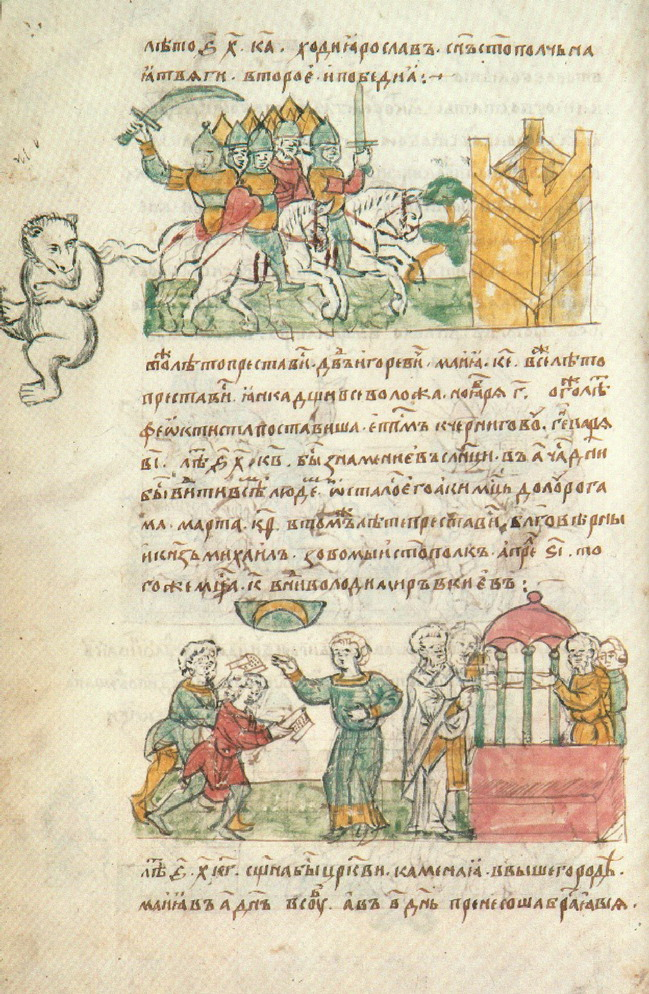
309

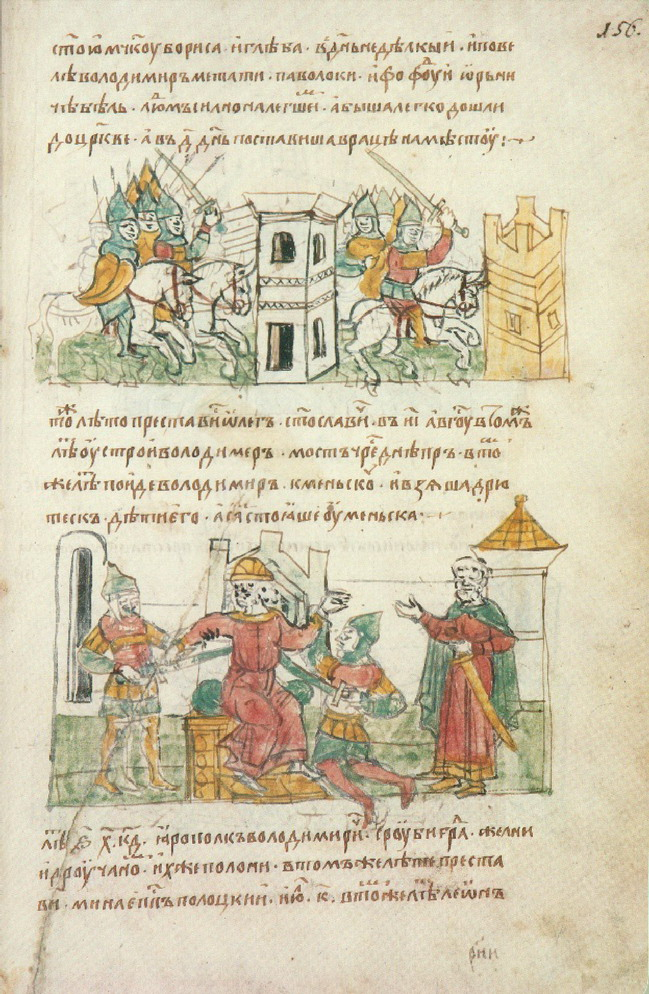
310

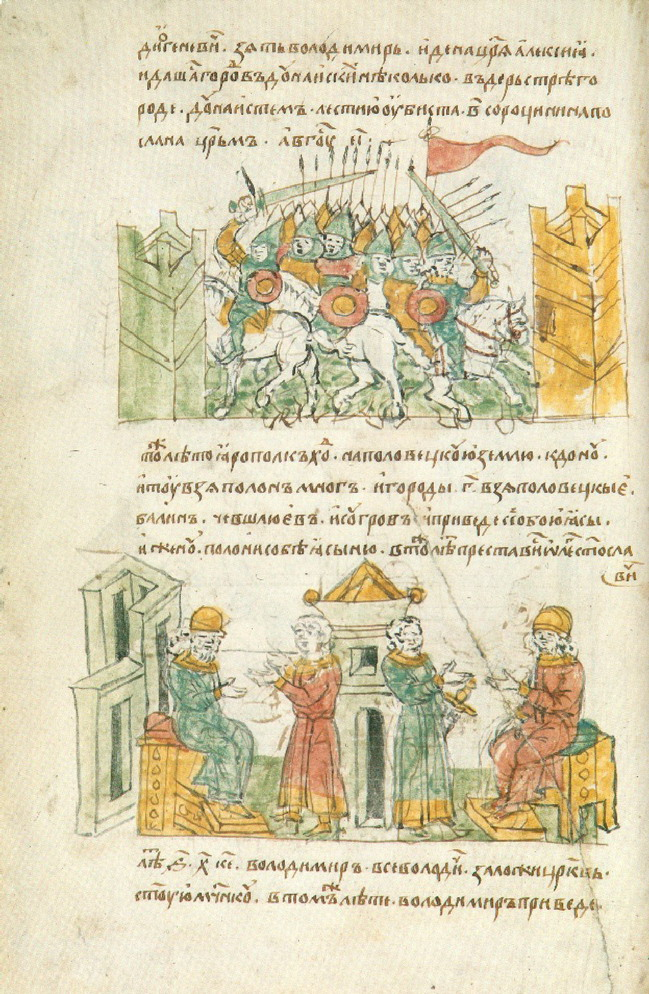
311

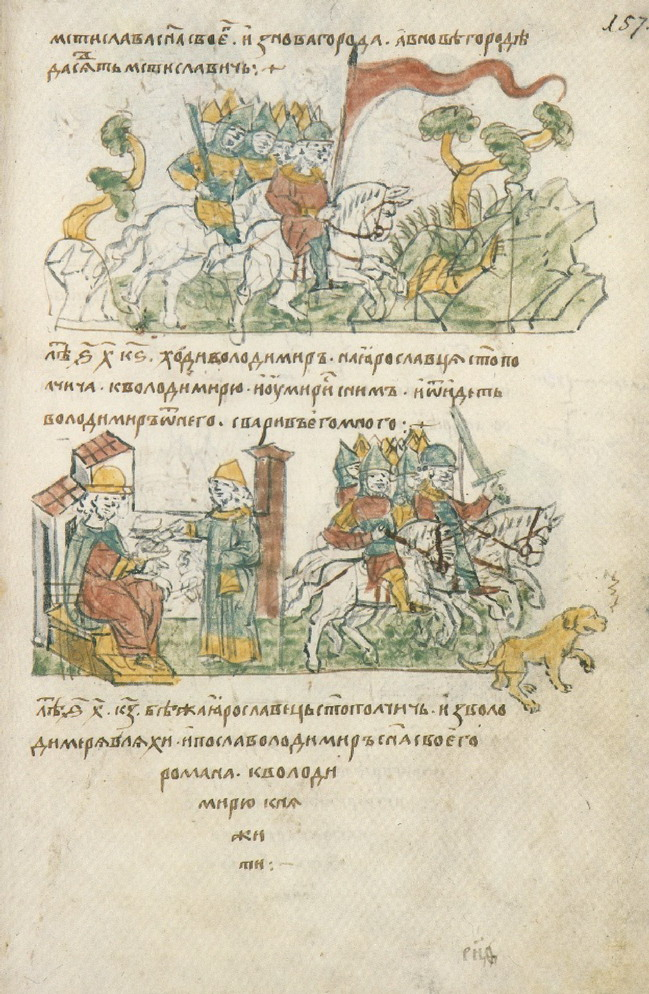
312

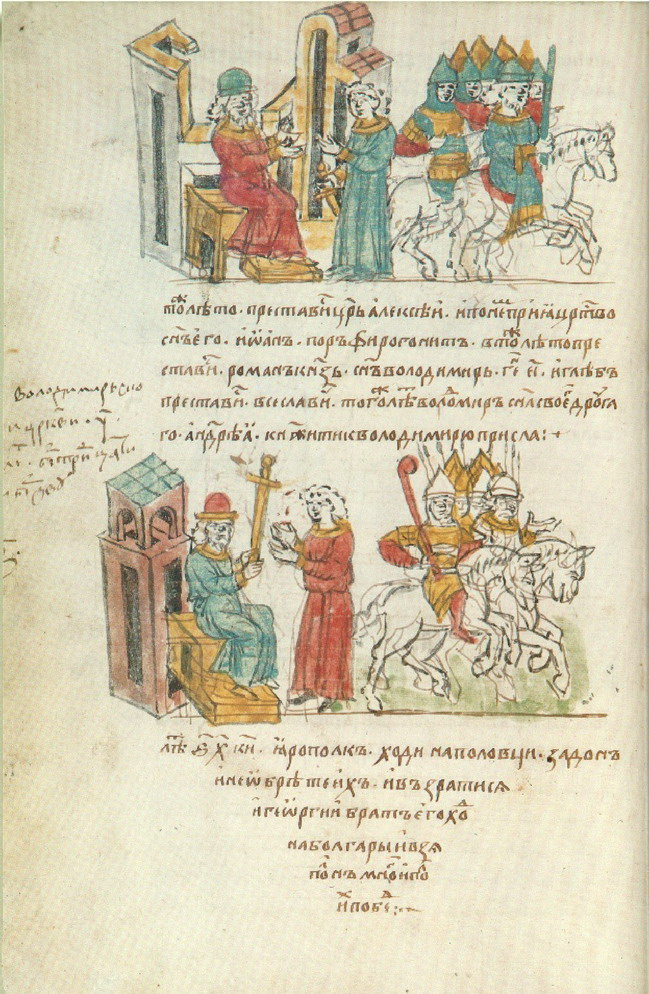
313

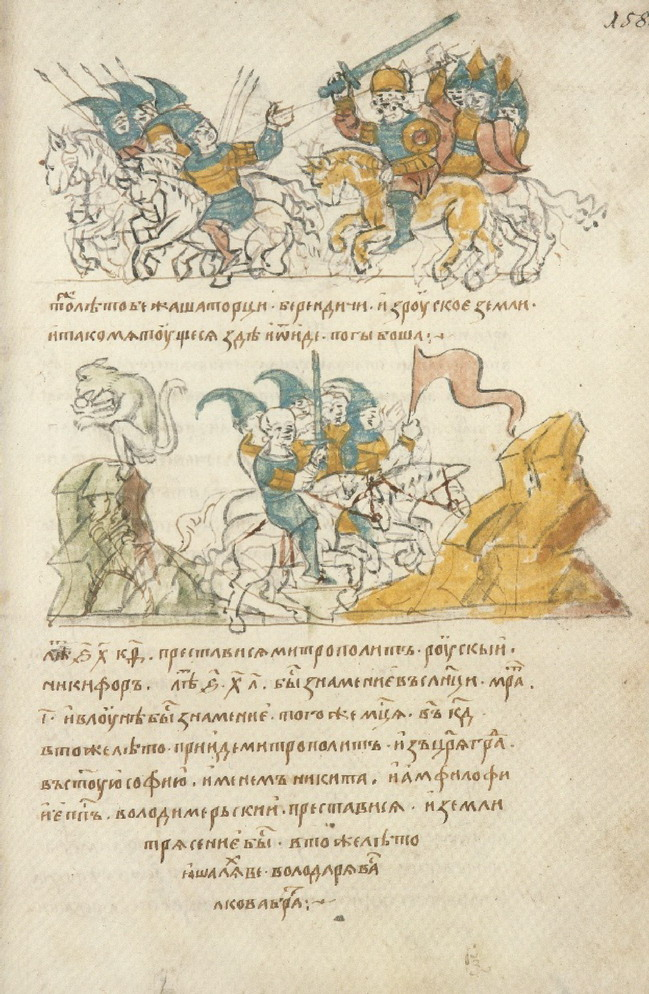
314

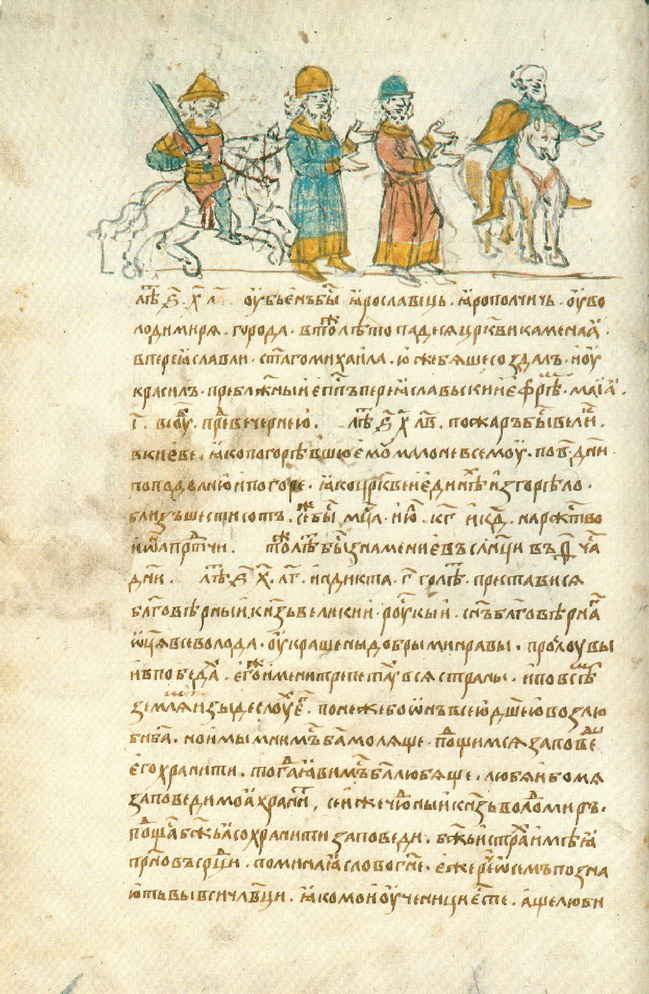
315

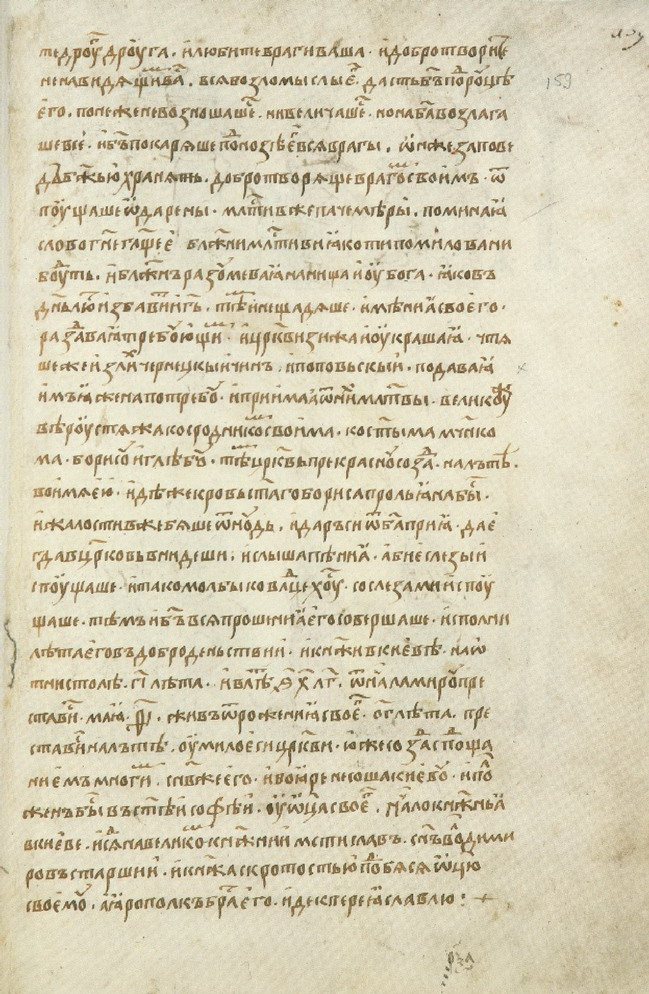
316

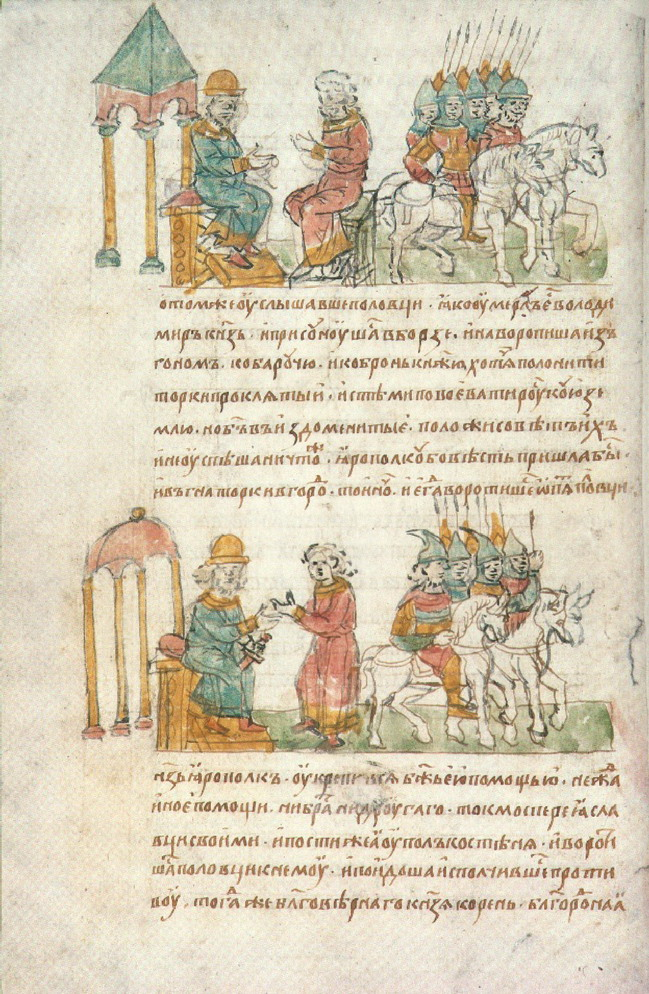
317

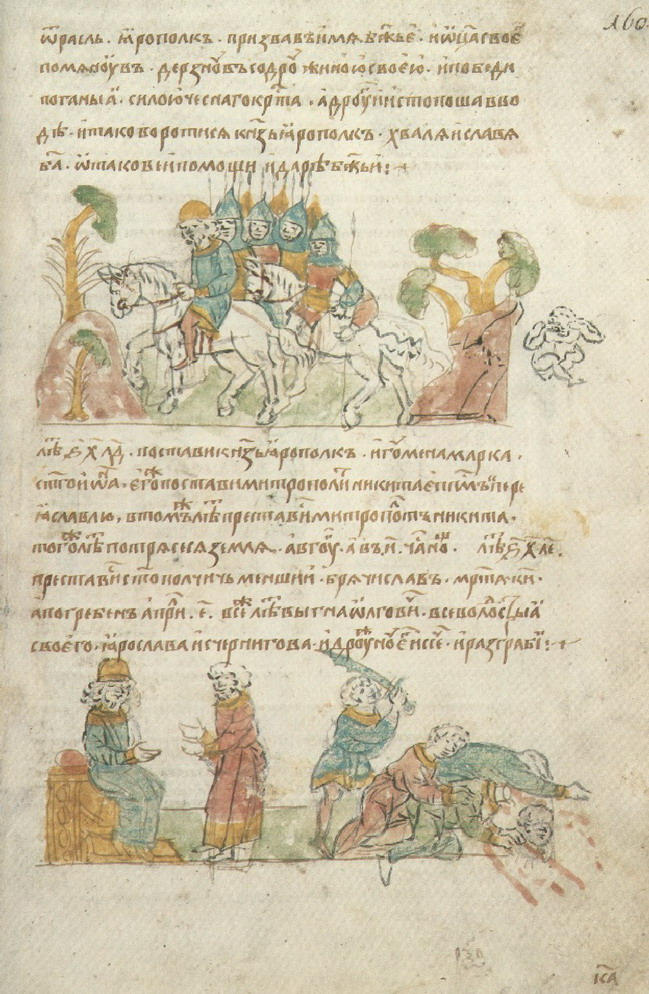
318

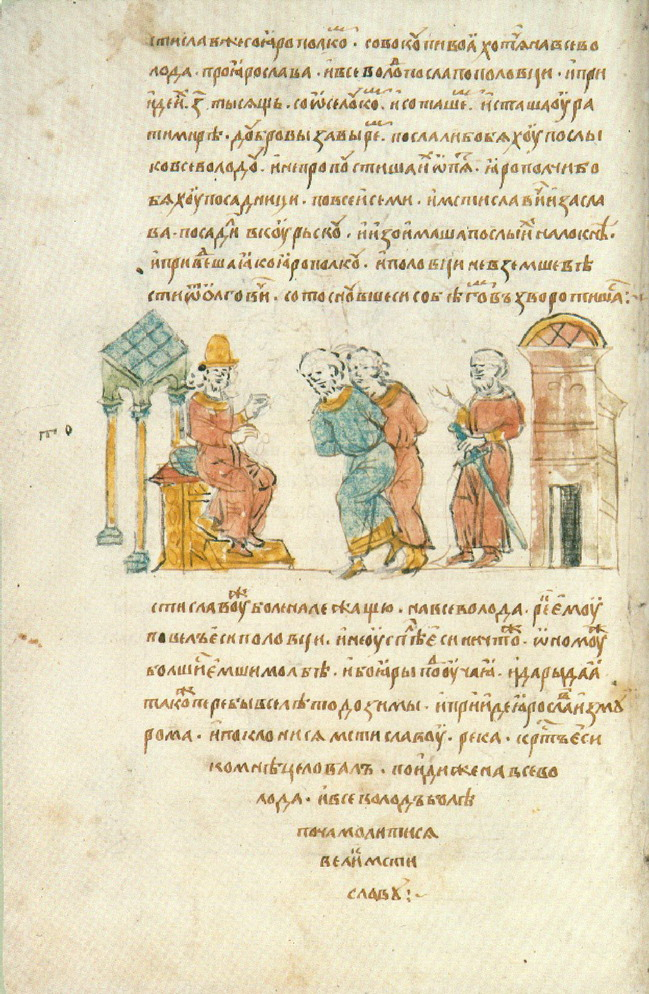
319

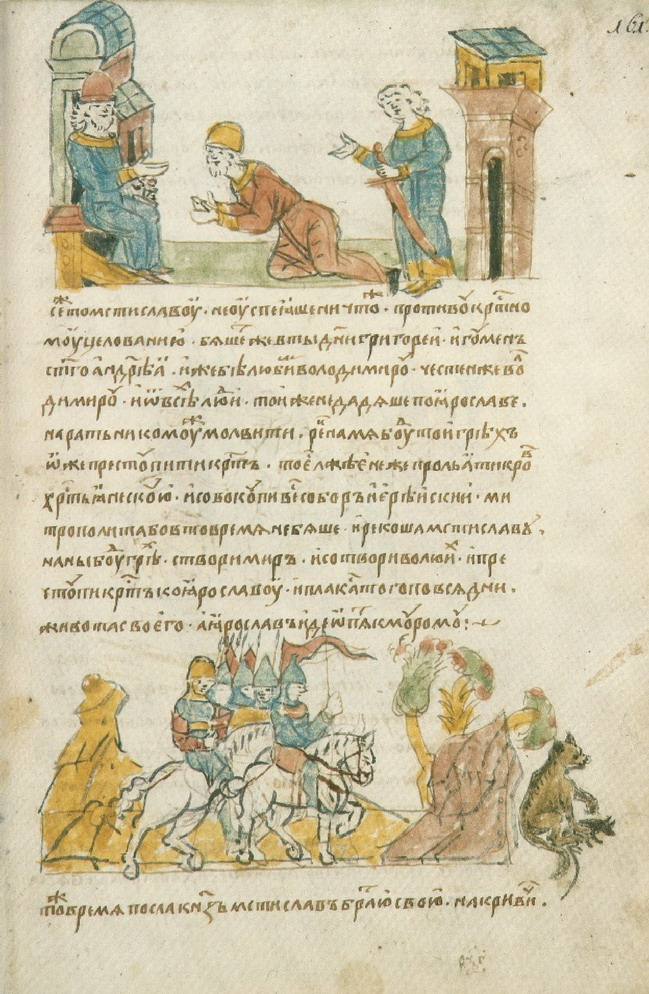
320

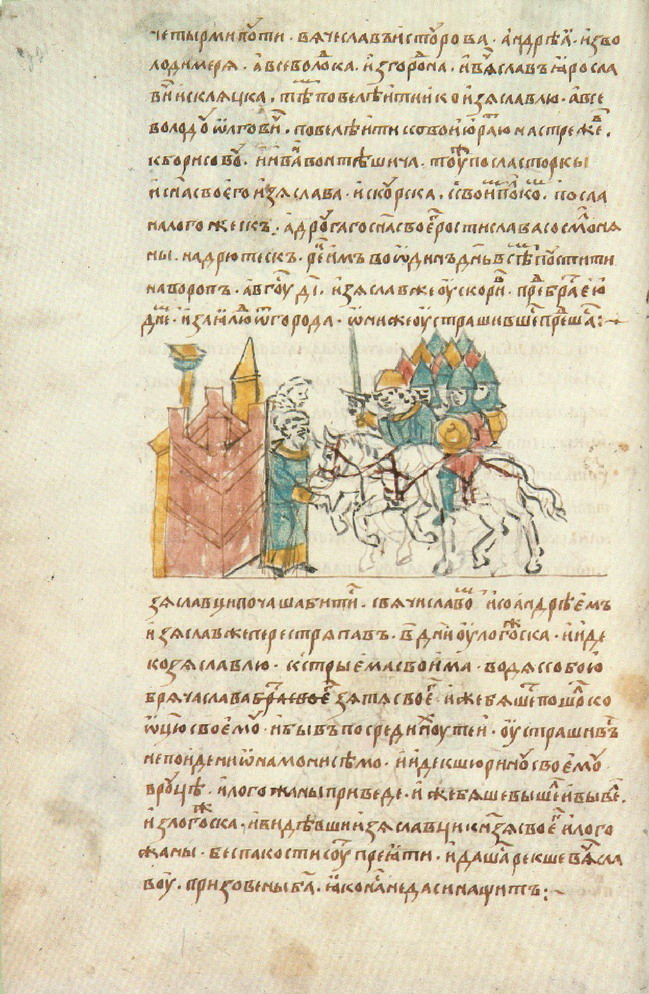
321

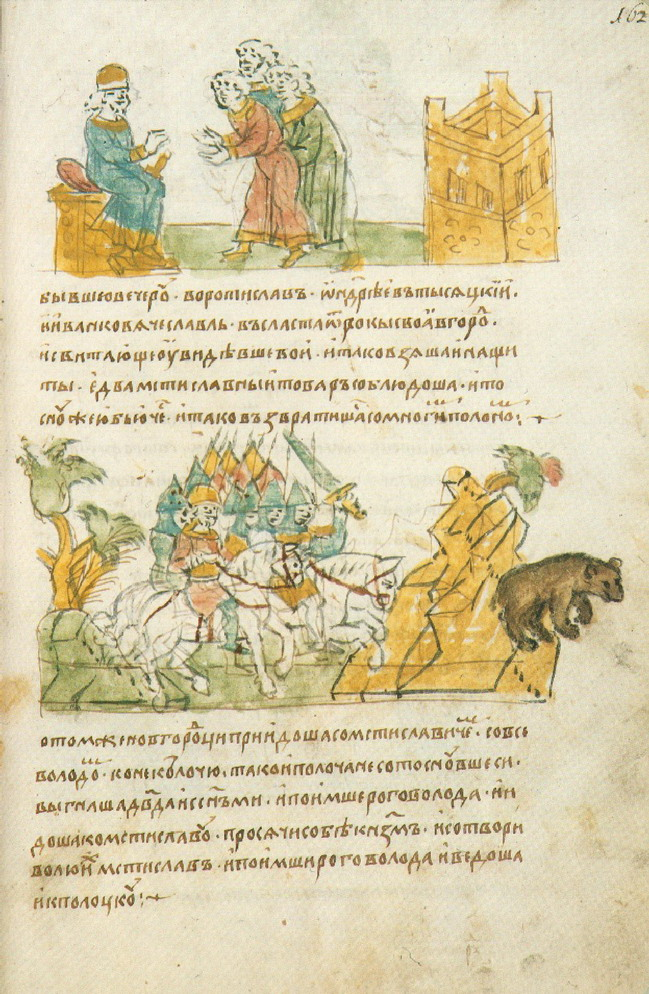
322

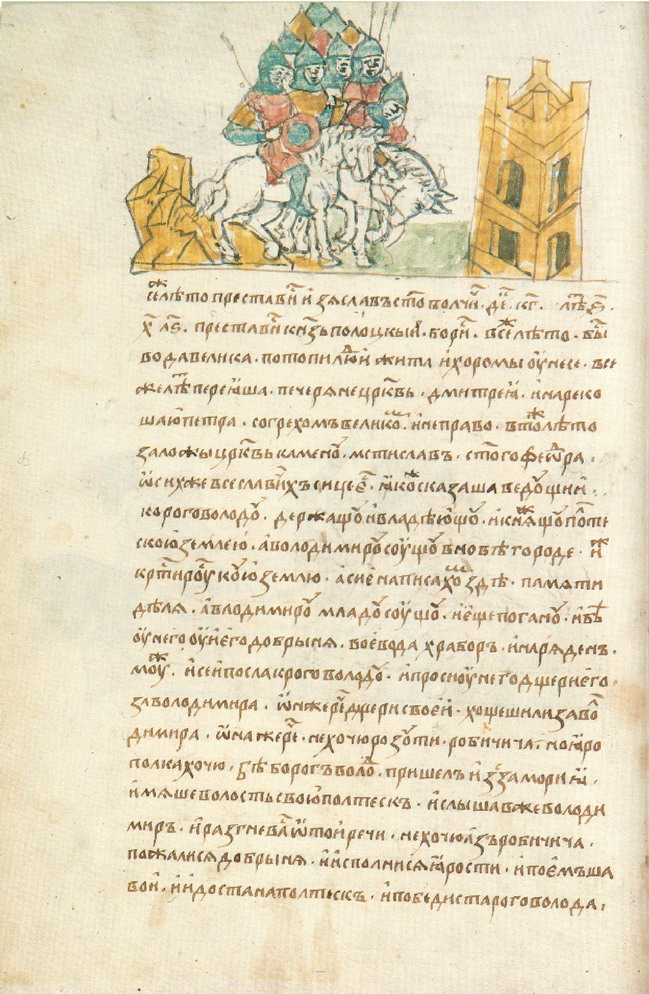
323

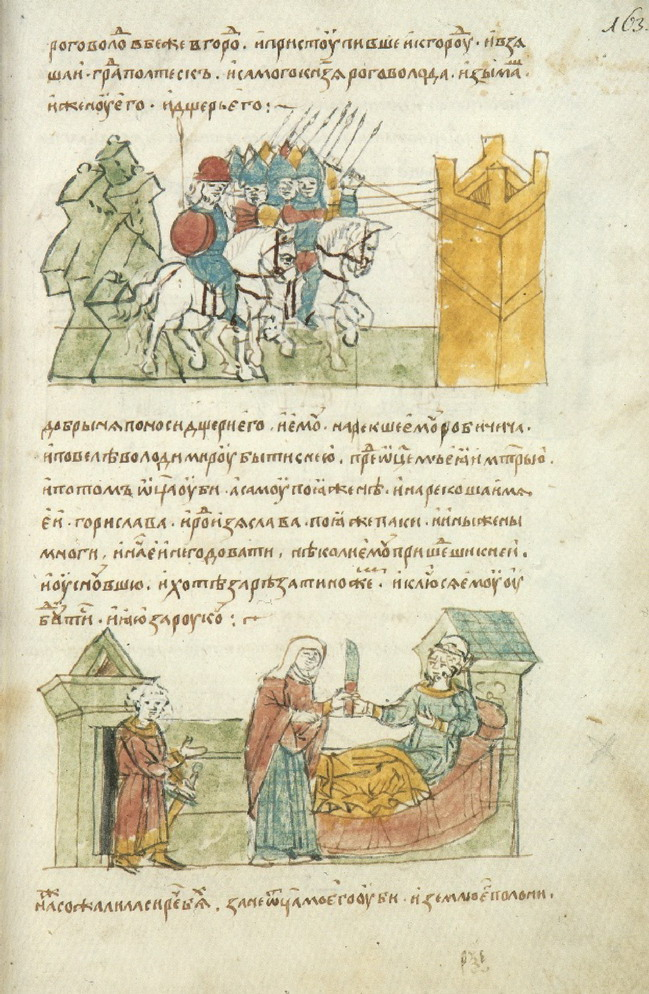
324

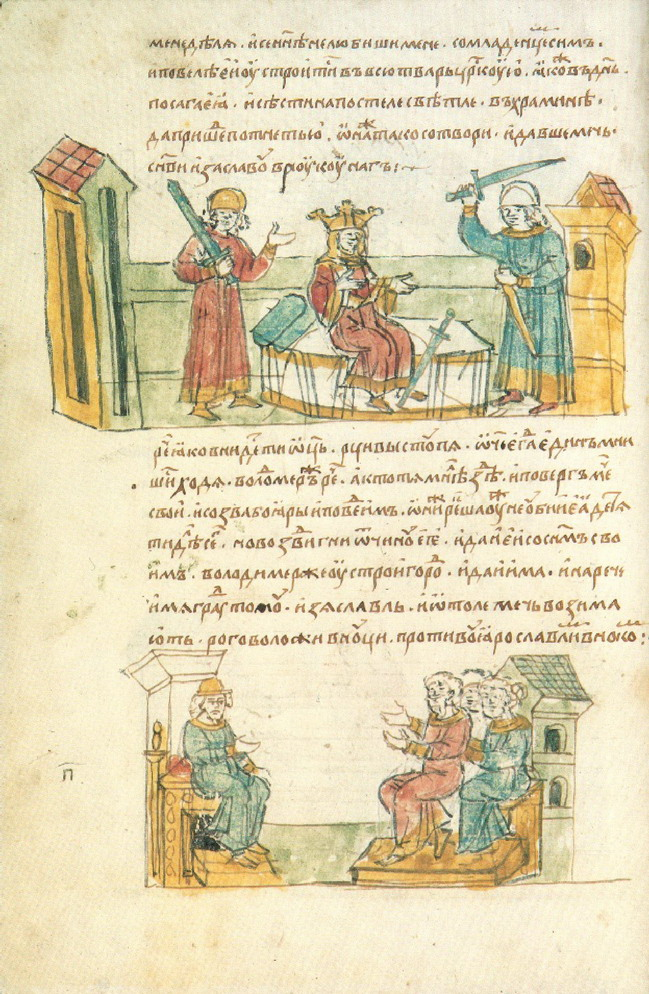
325

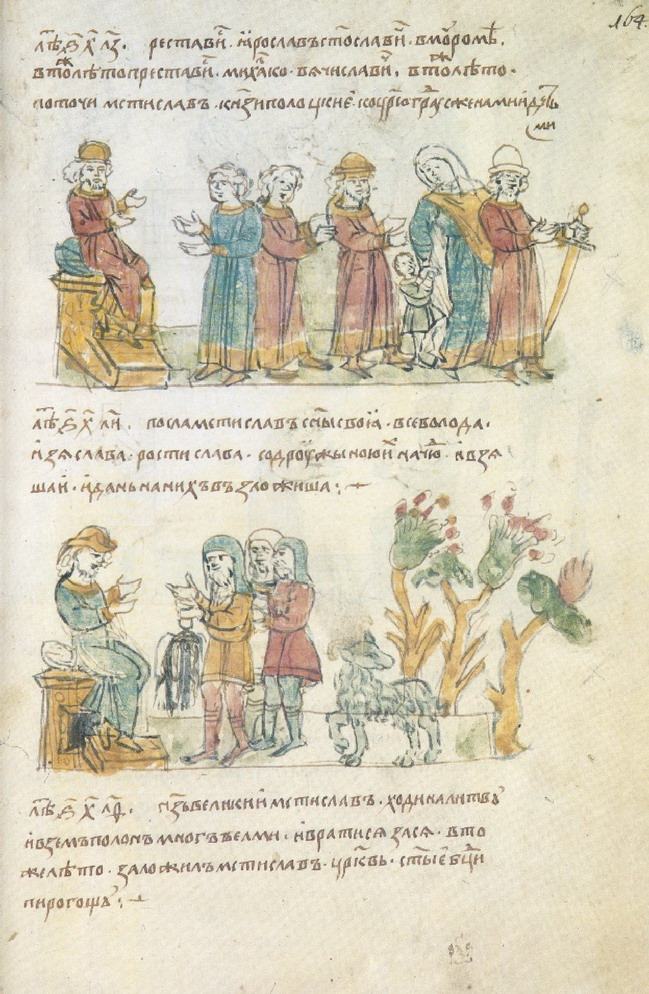
326

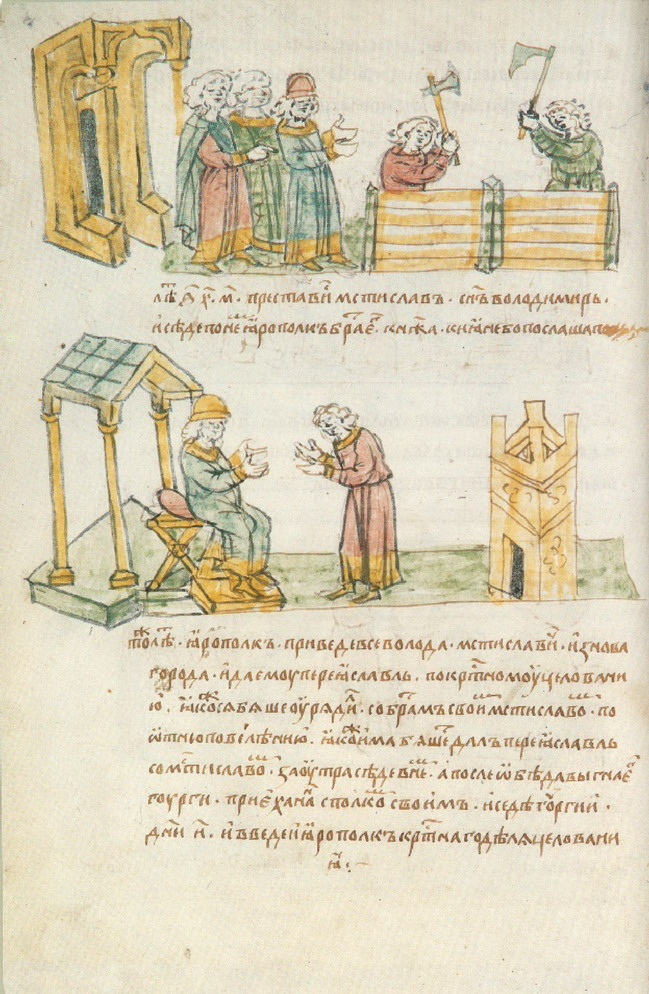
327

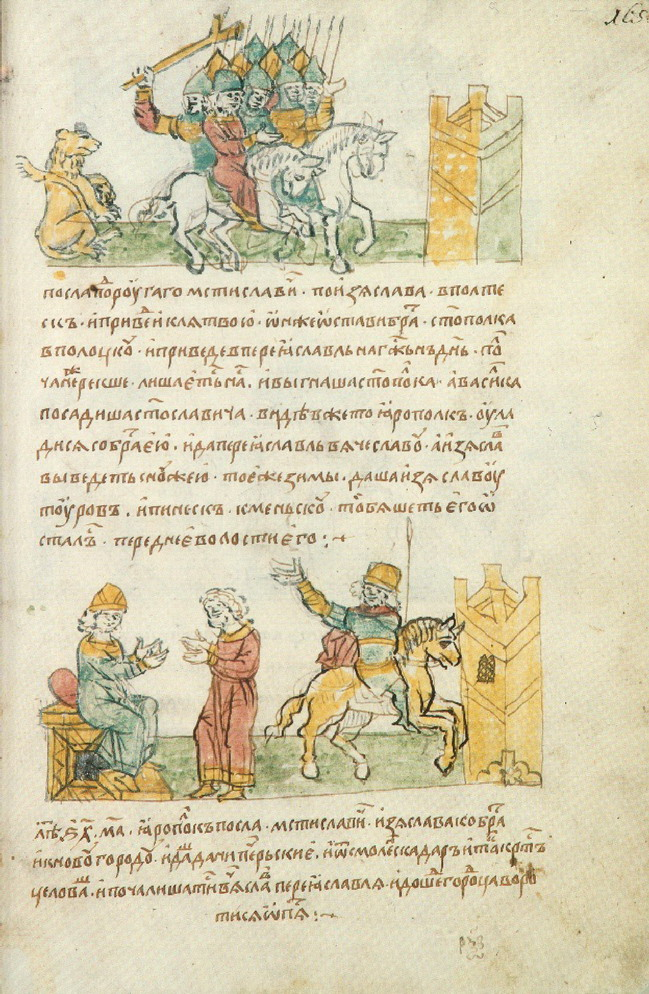
328

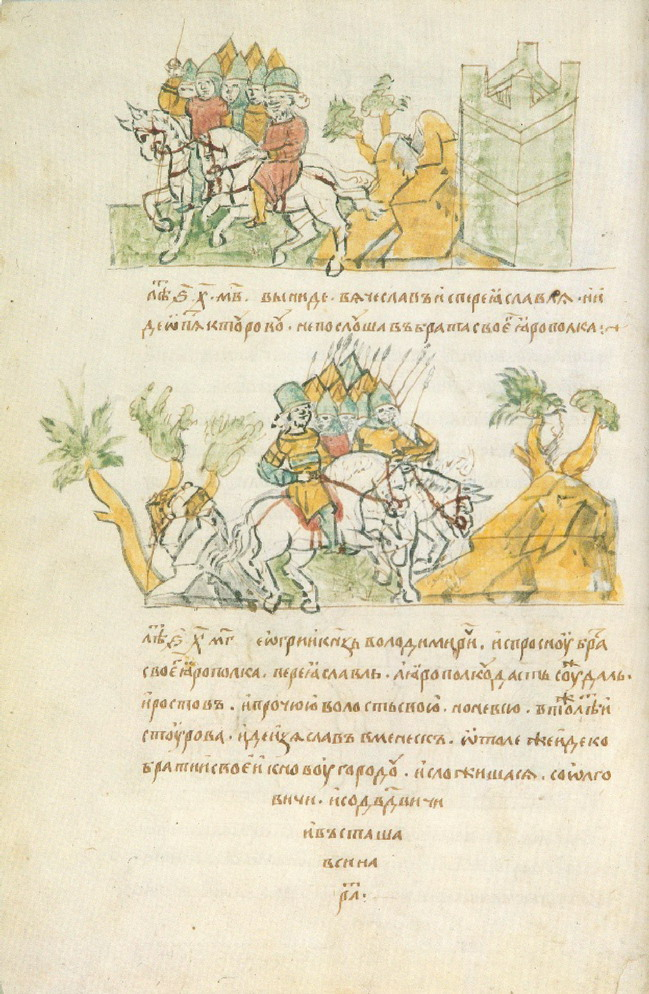
329

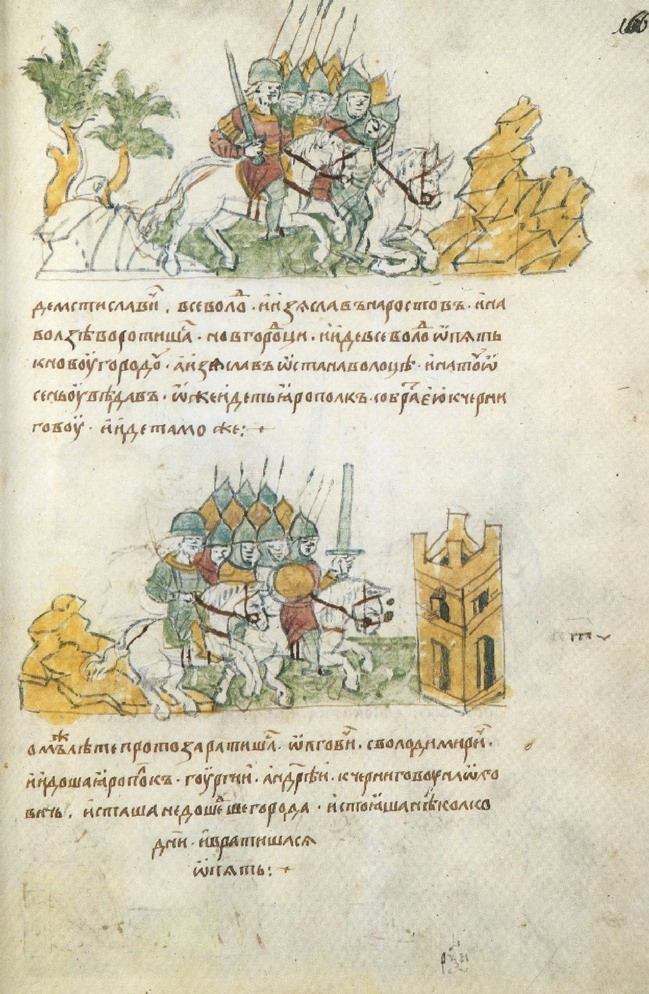
330

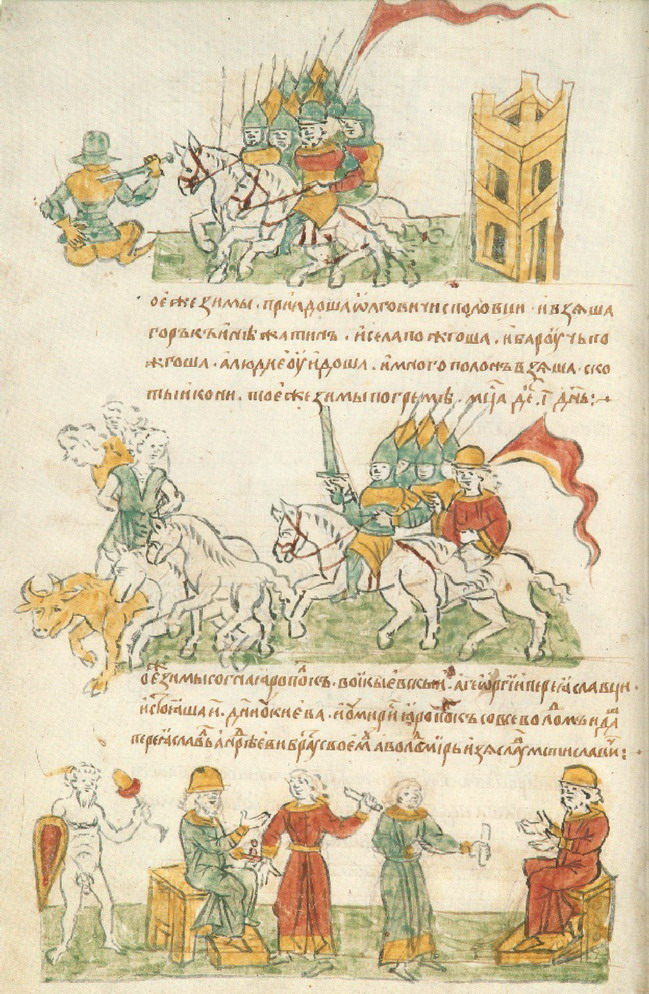
331

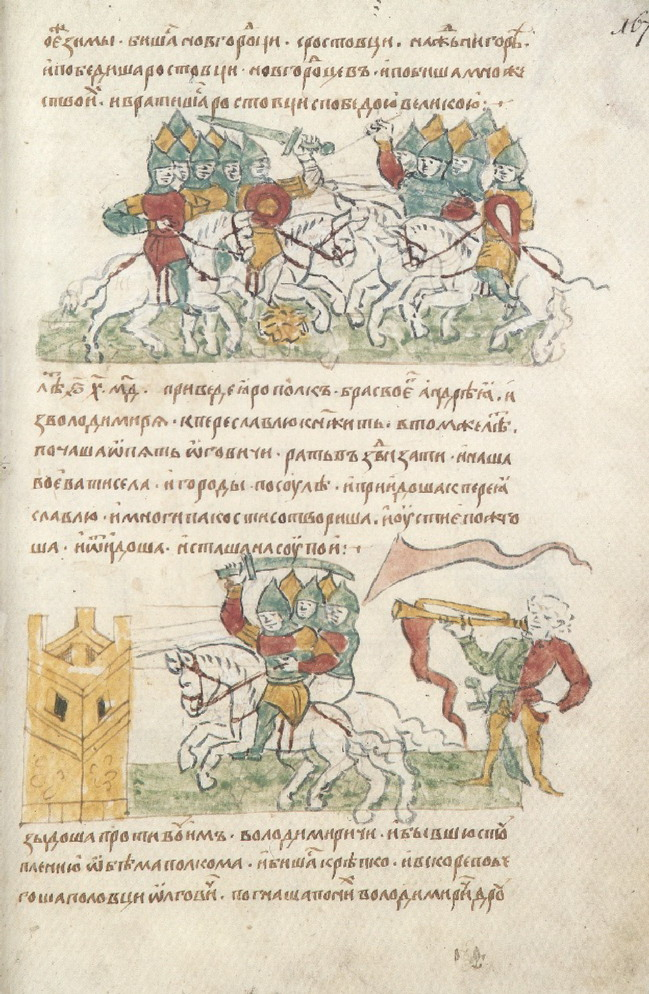
332

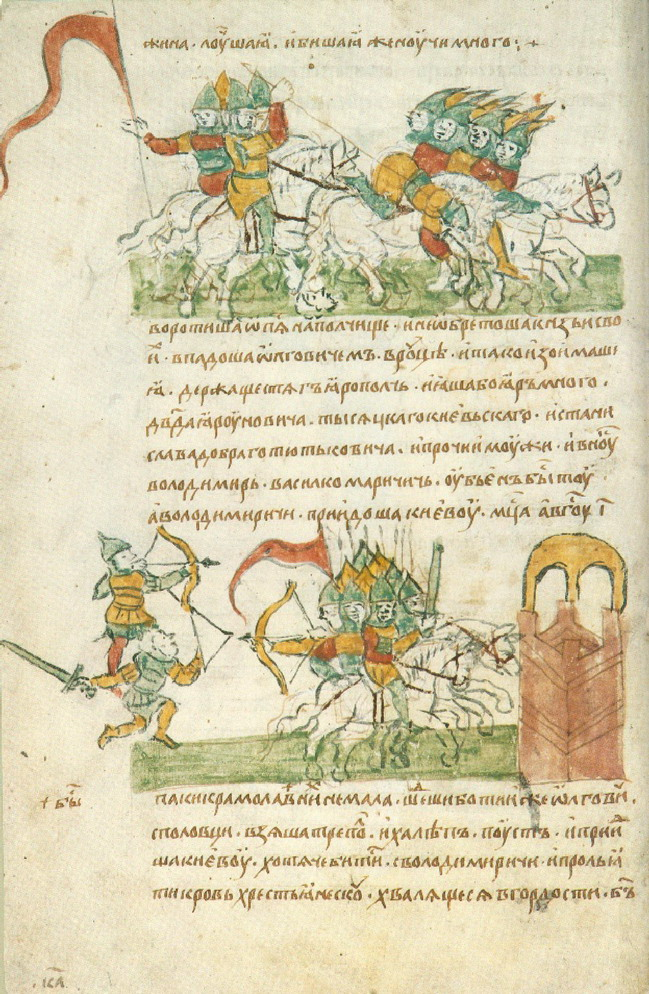
333

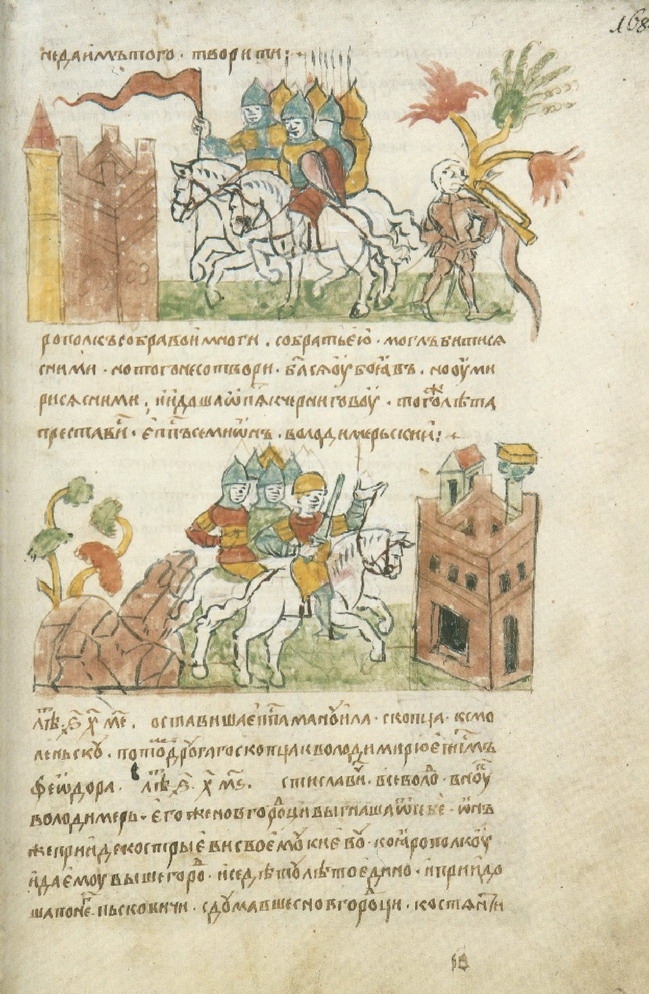
334

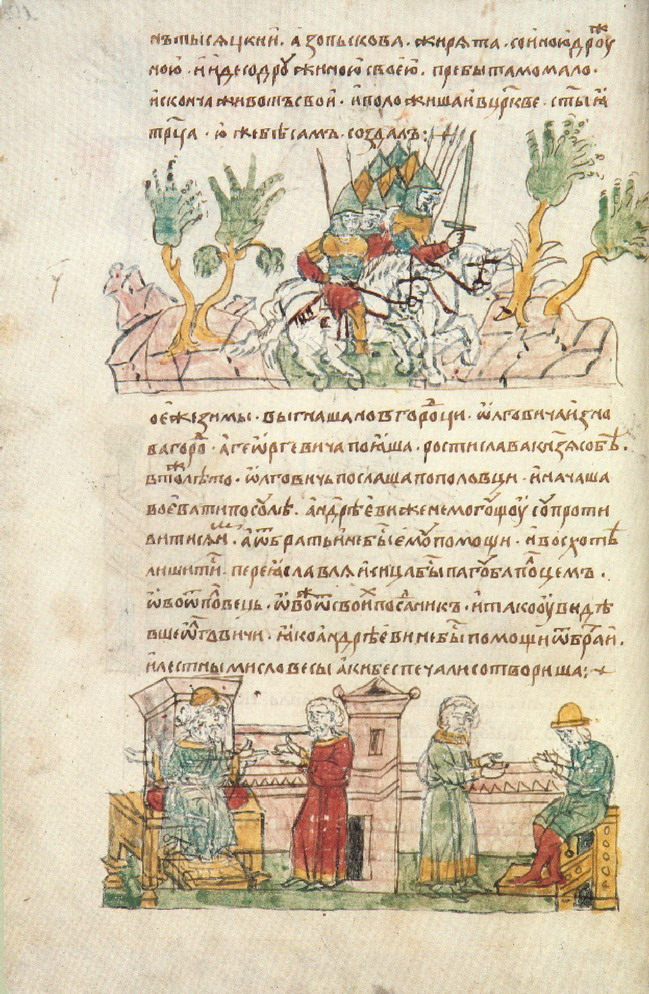
335

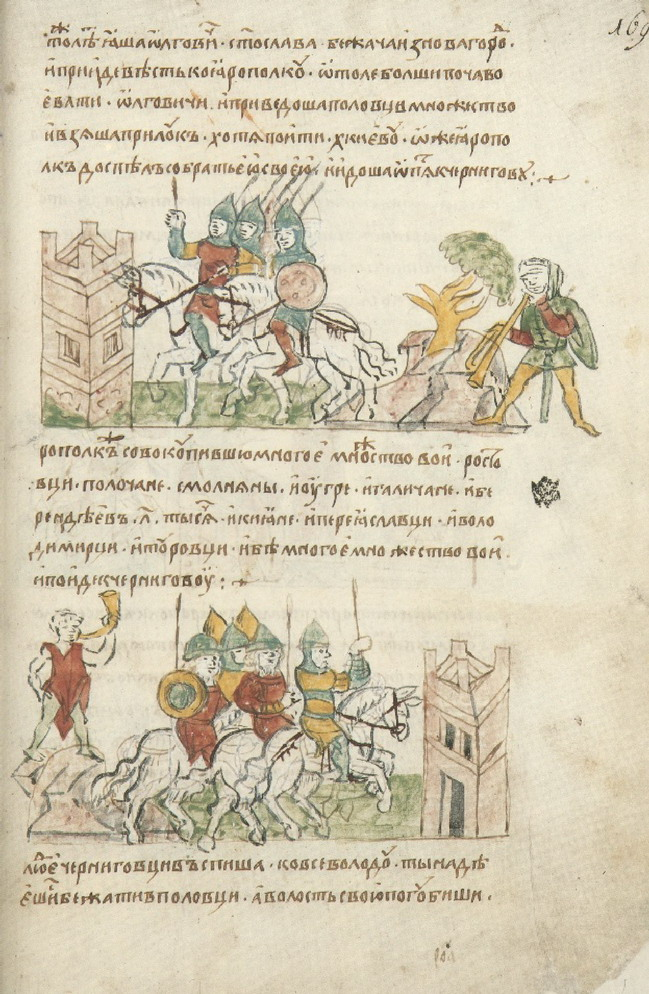
336

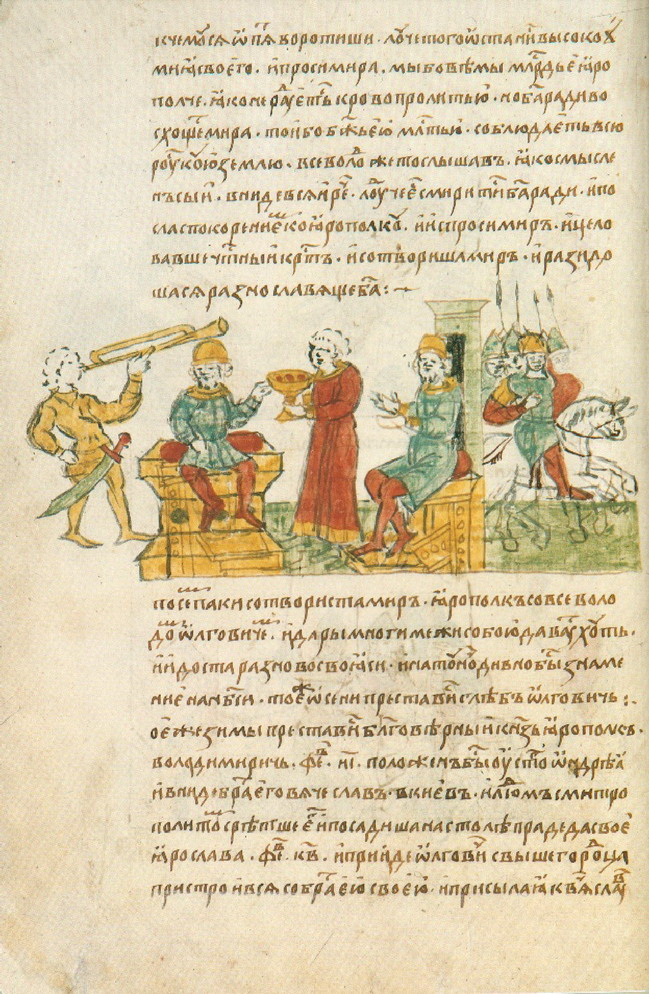
337

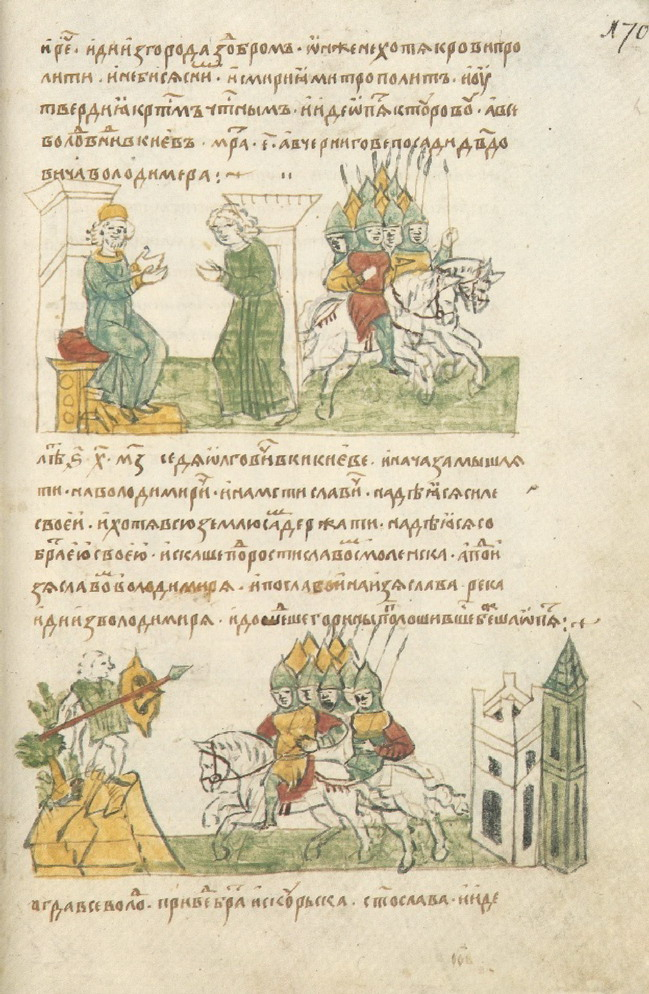
338

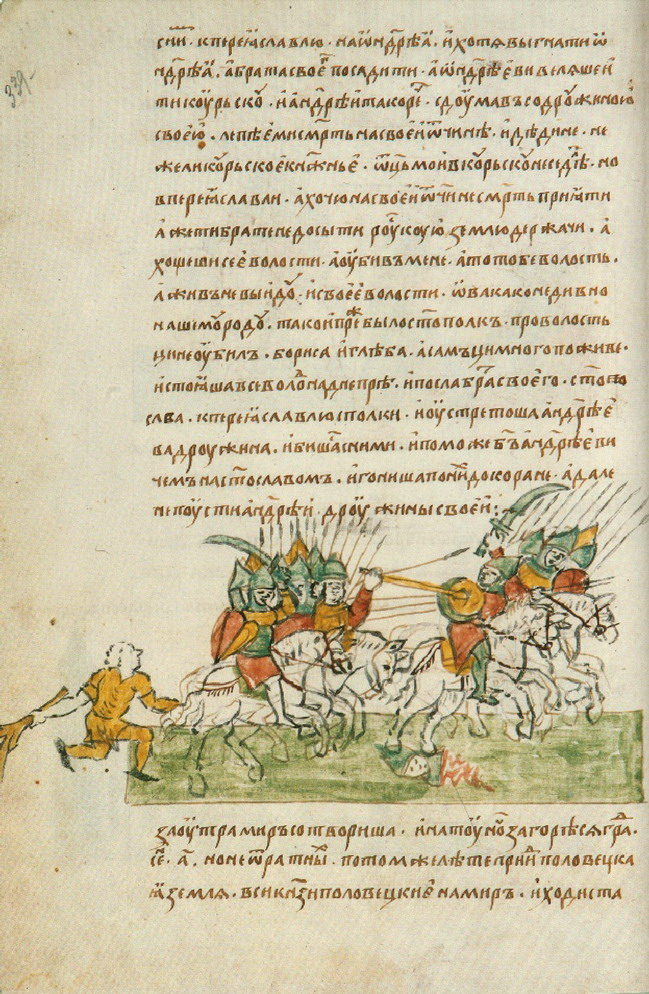
339

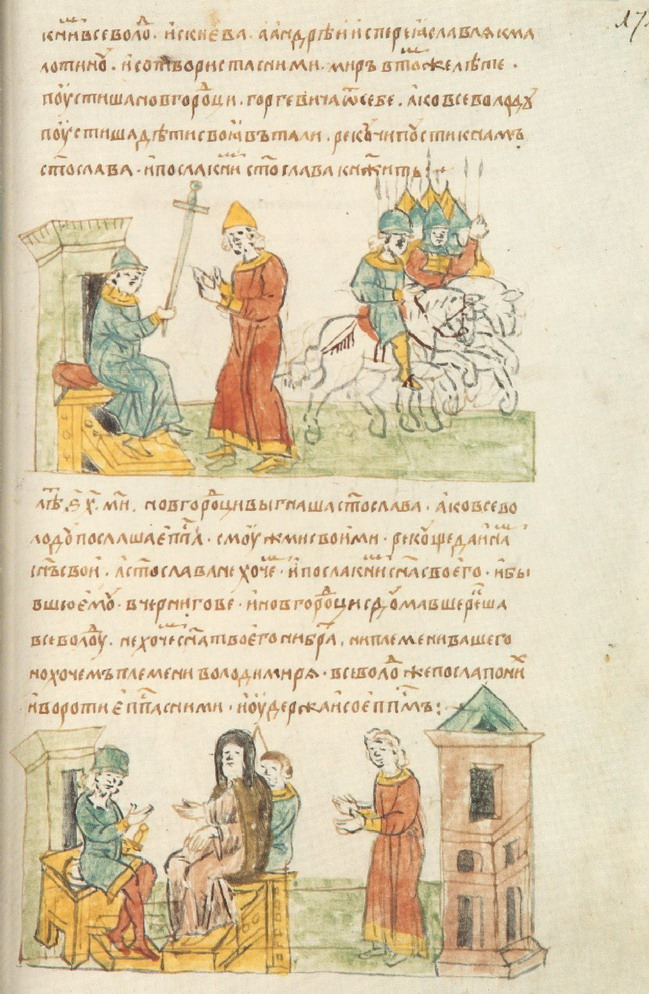
340

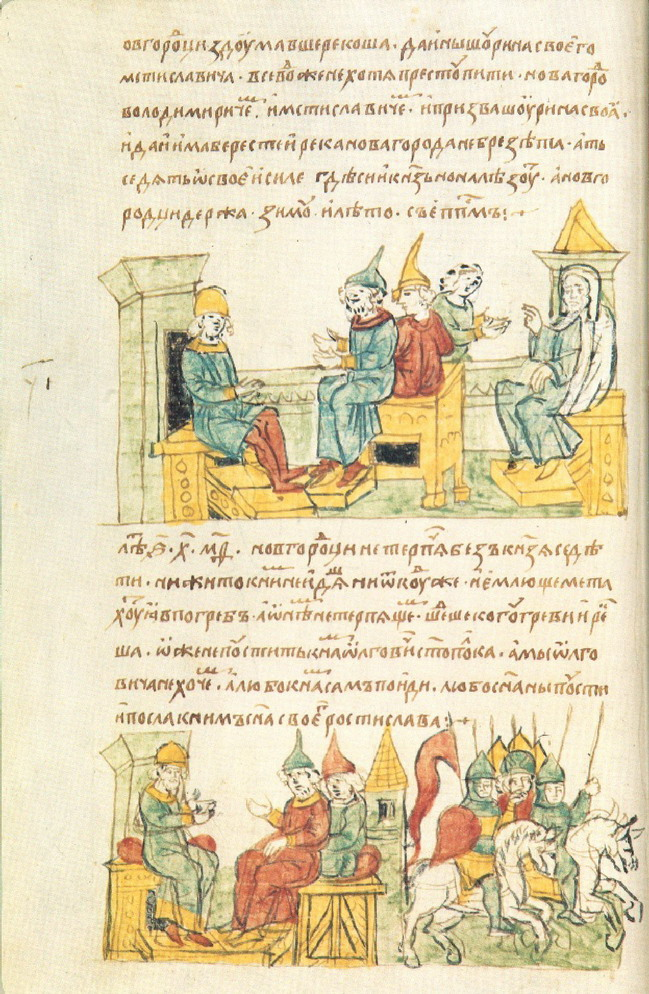
341

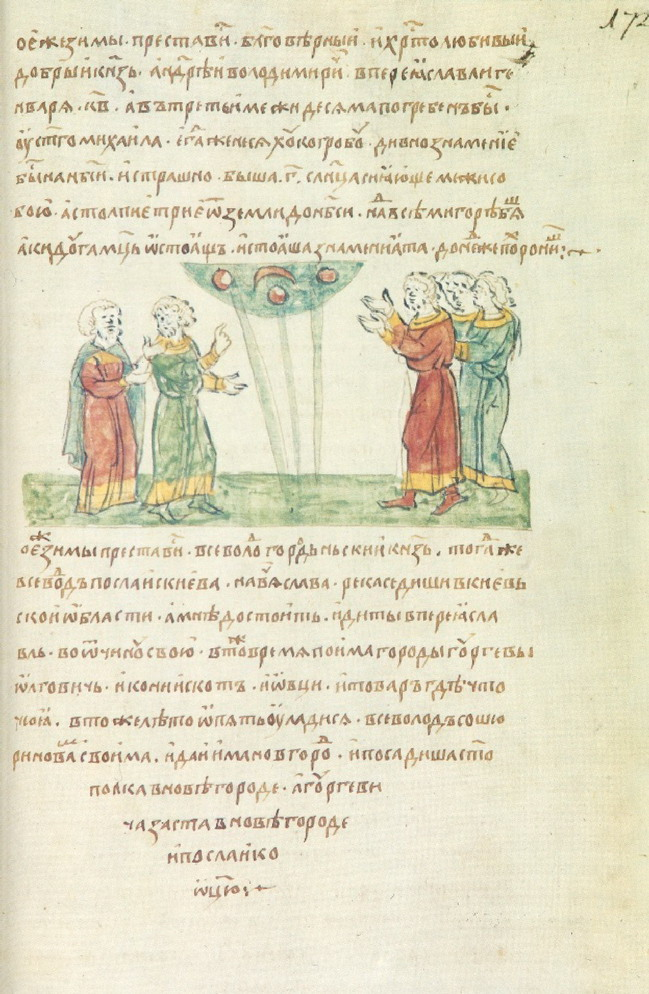
342

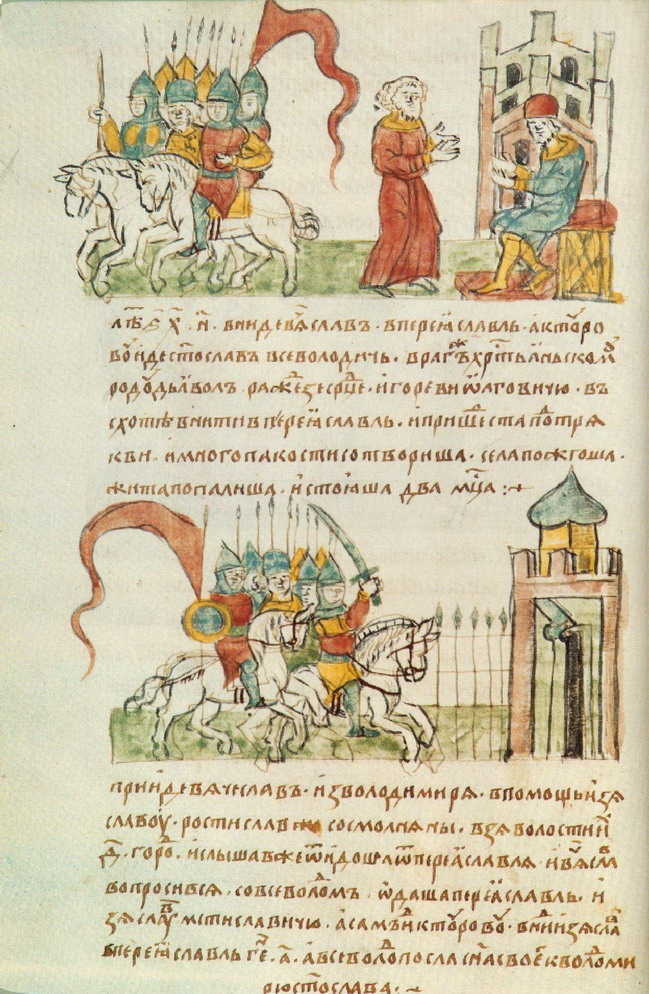
343

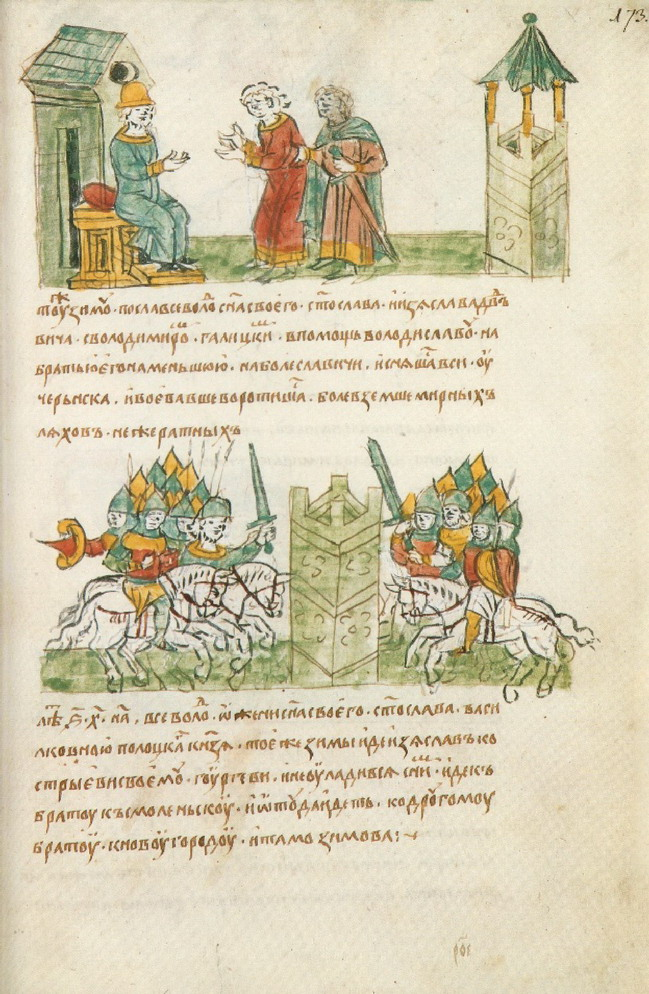
344

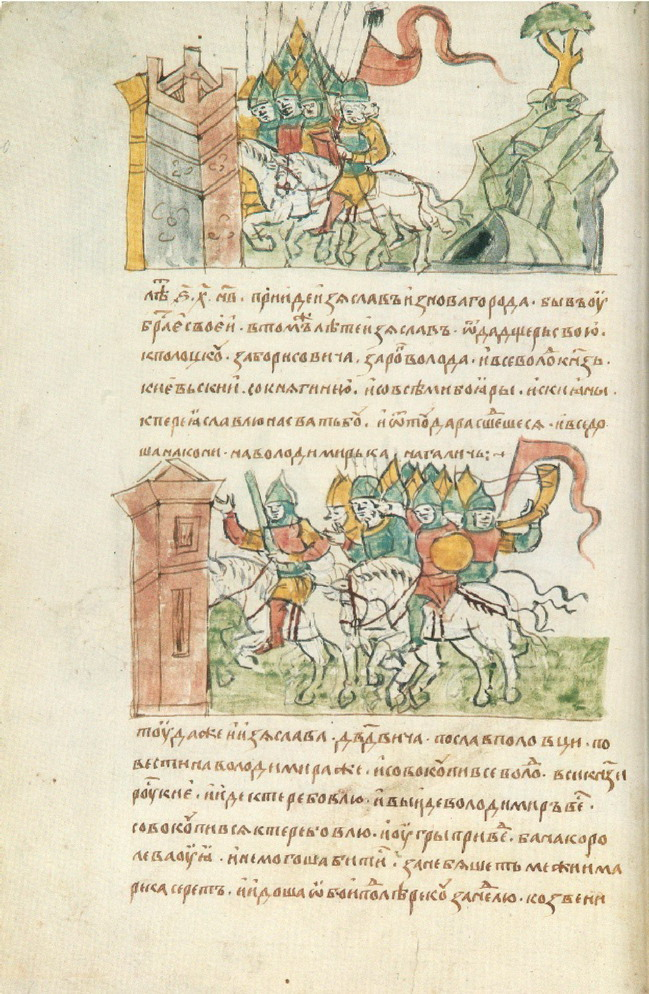
345

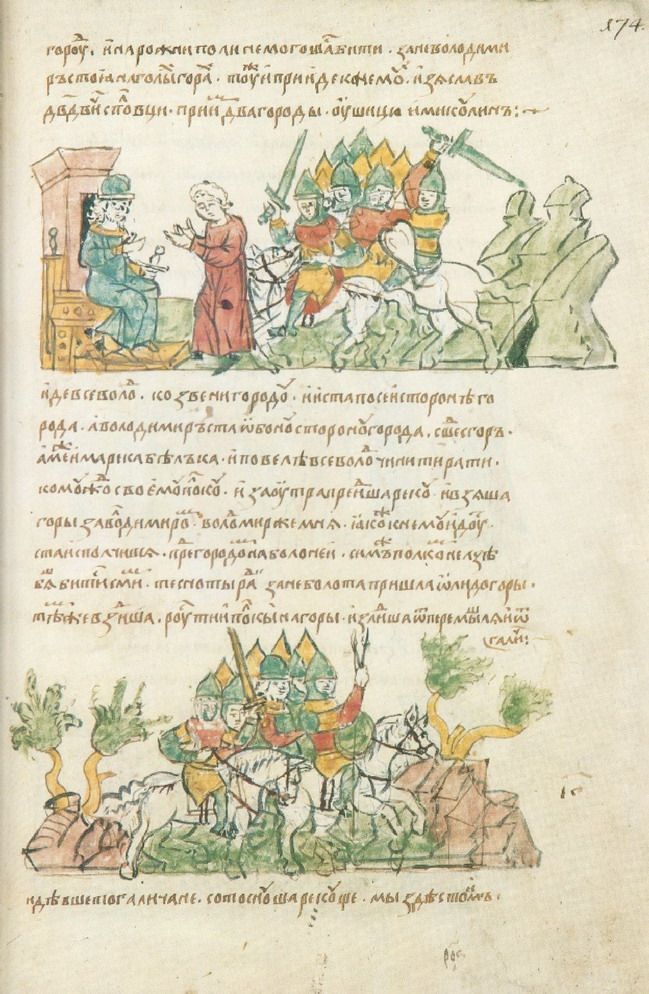
346

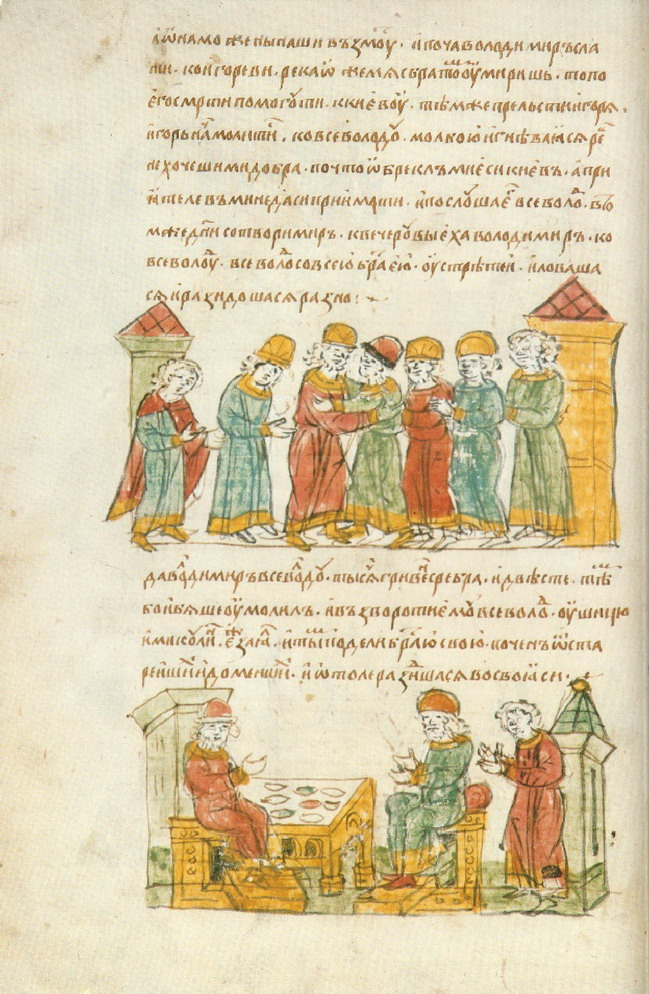
347

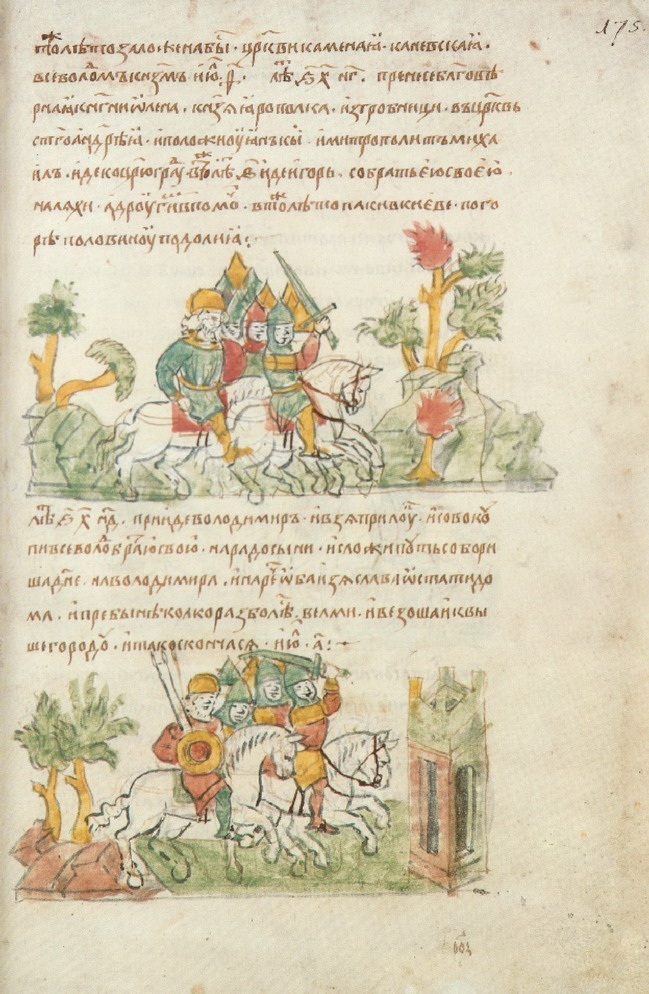
348

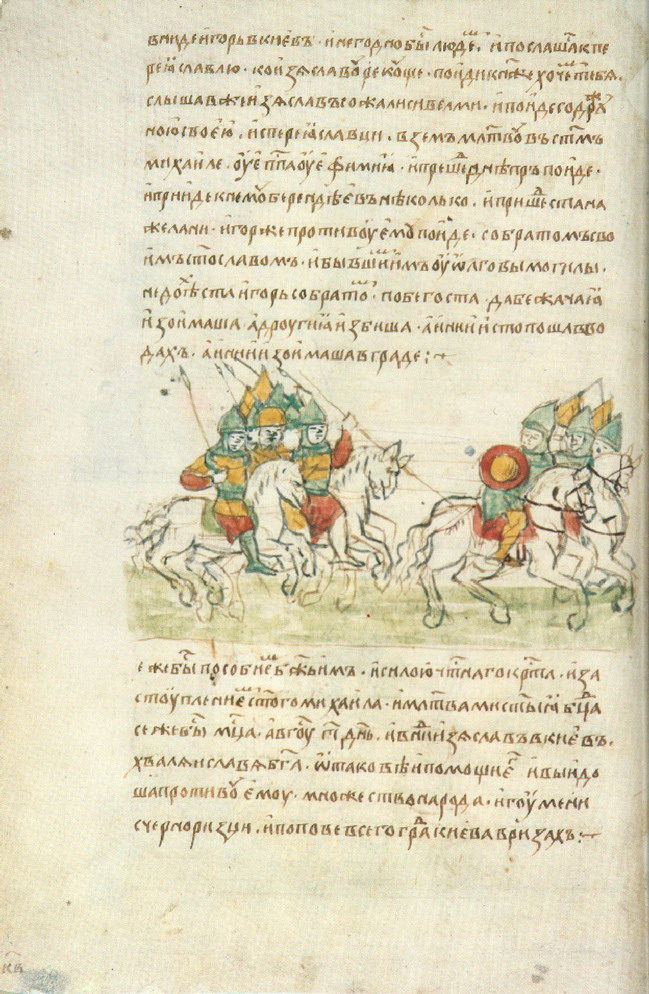
349

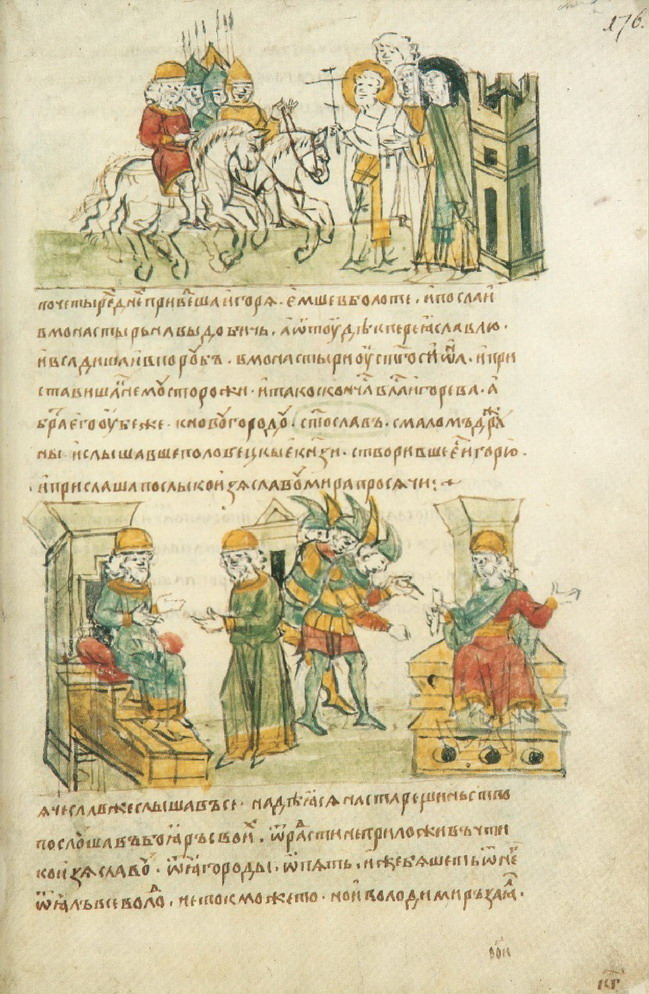
350

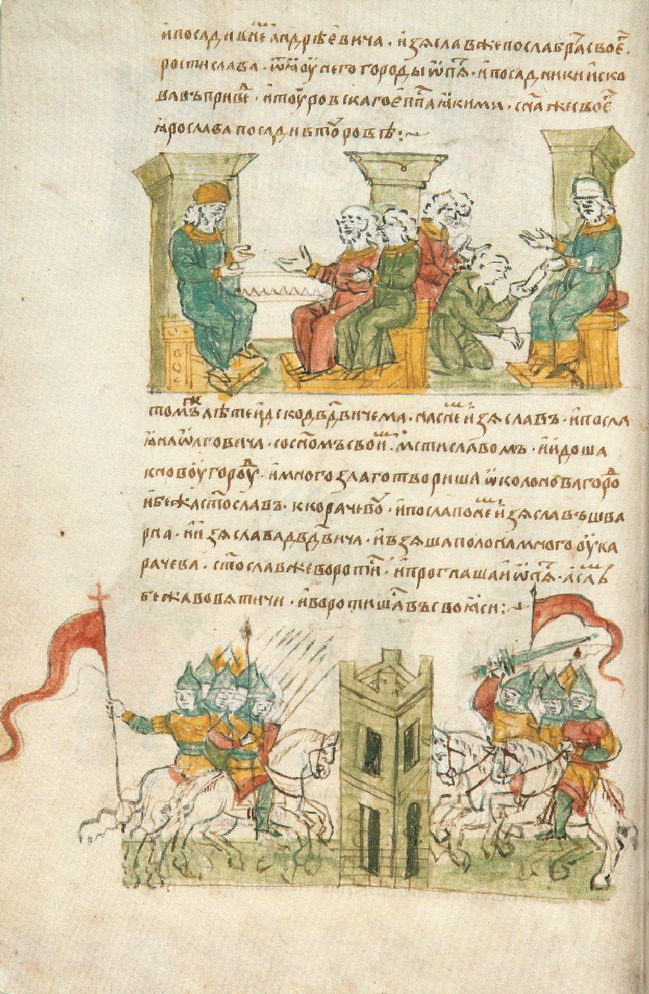
351

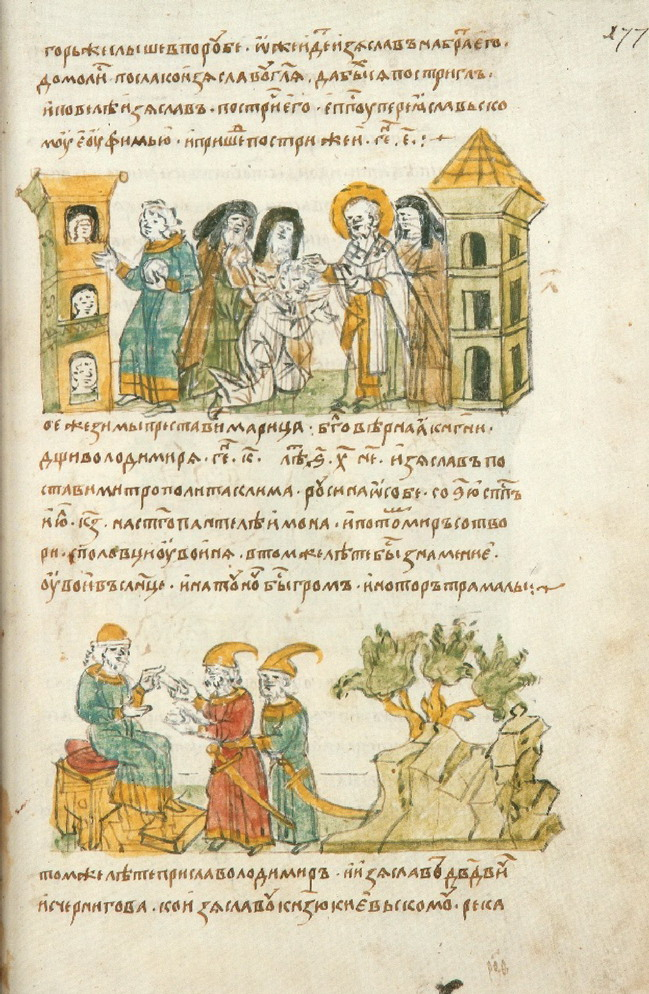
352

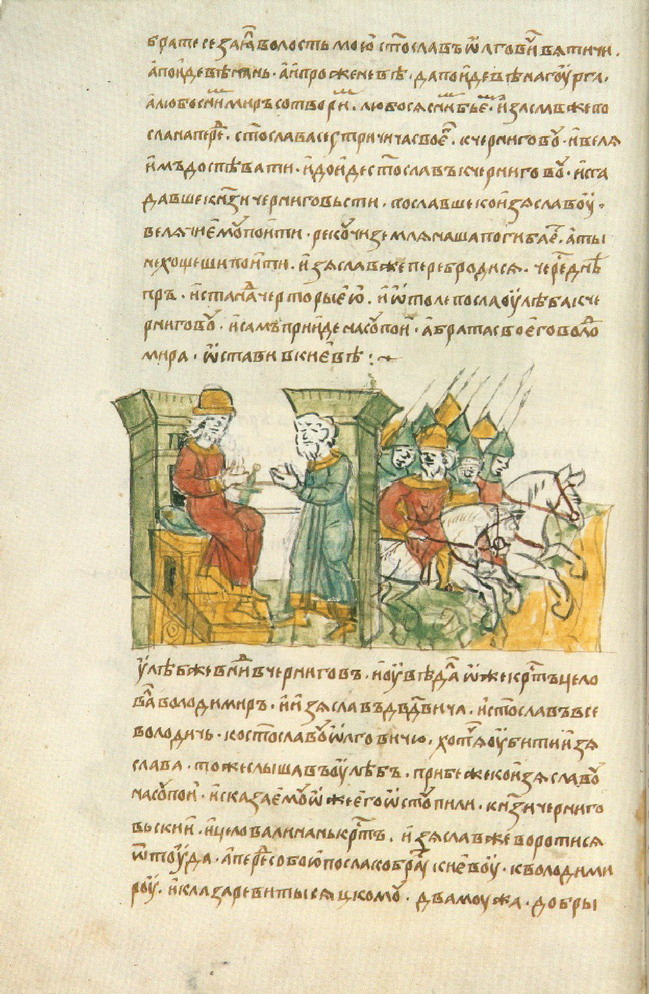
353

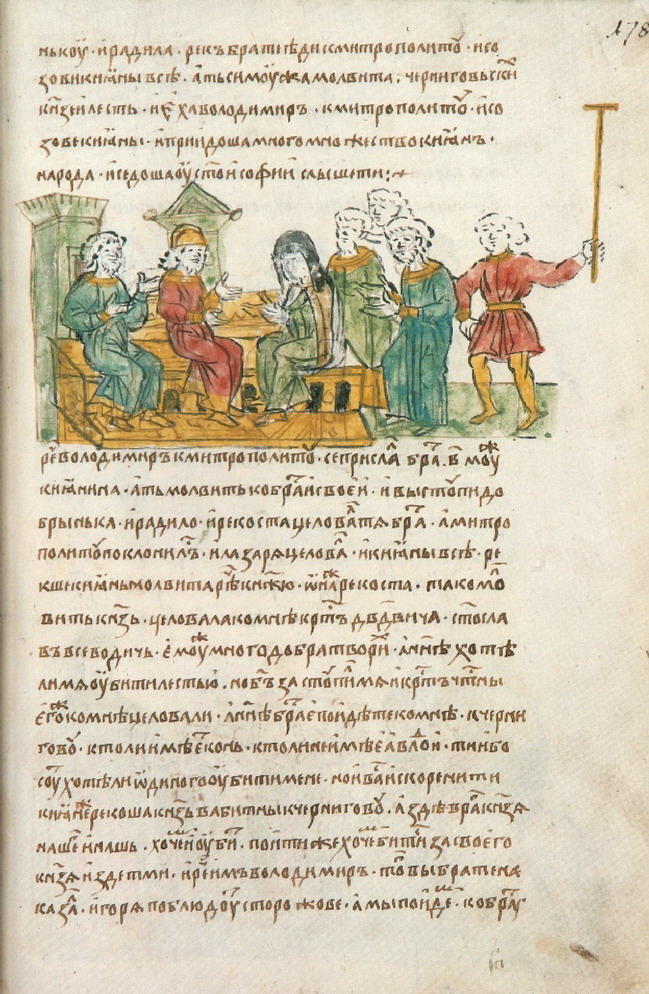
354

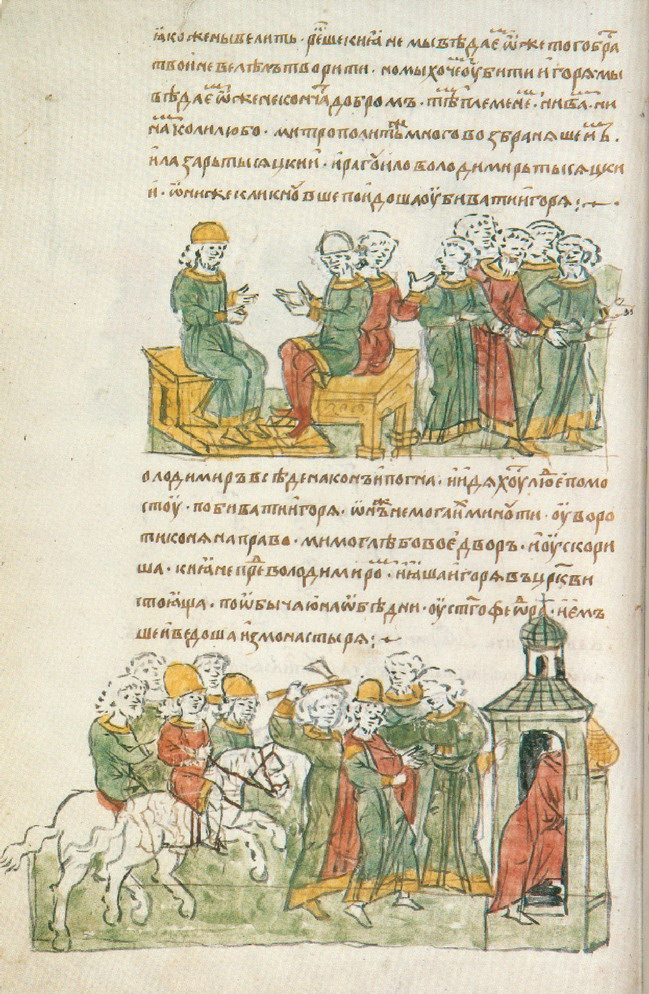
355

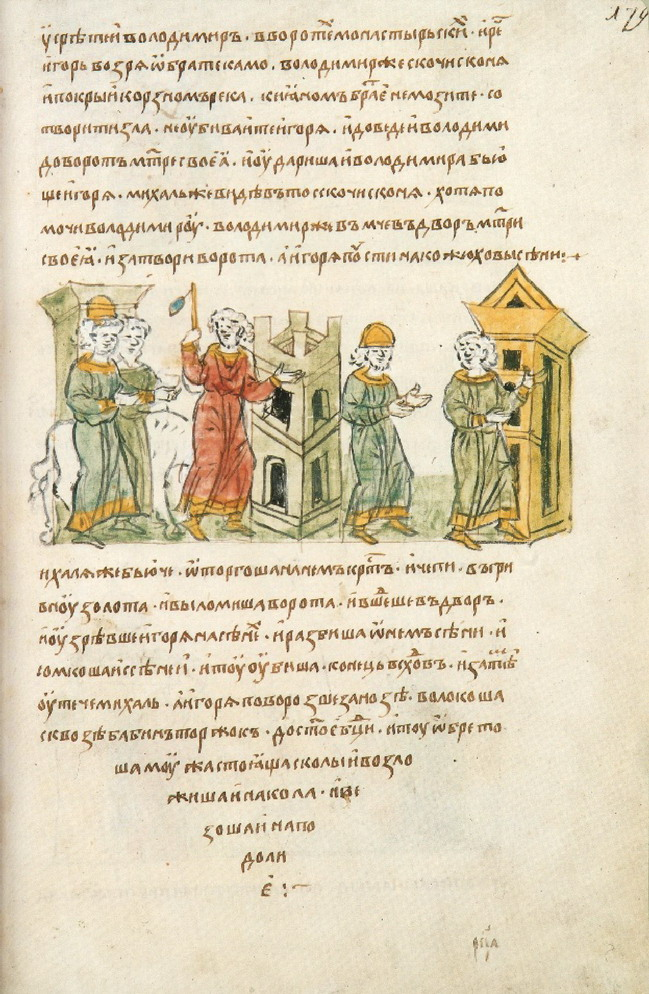
356

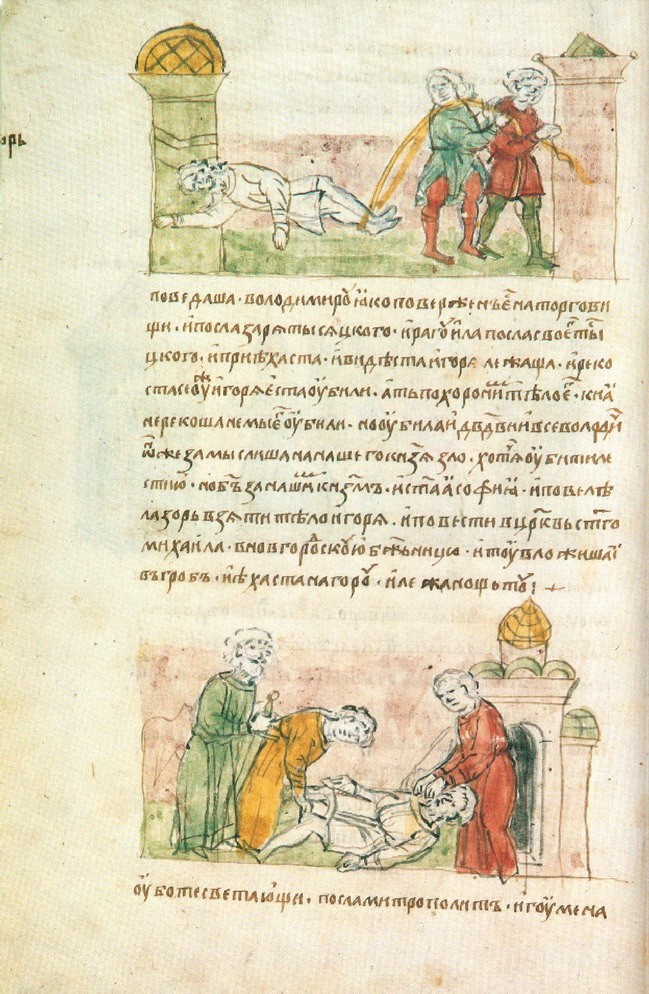
357

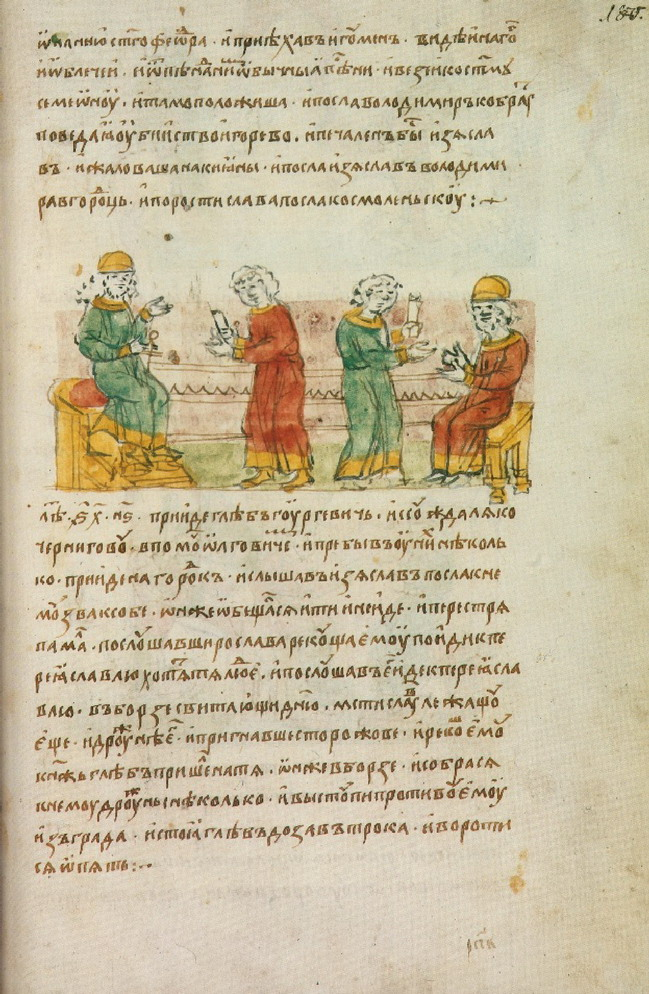
358

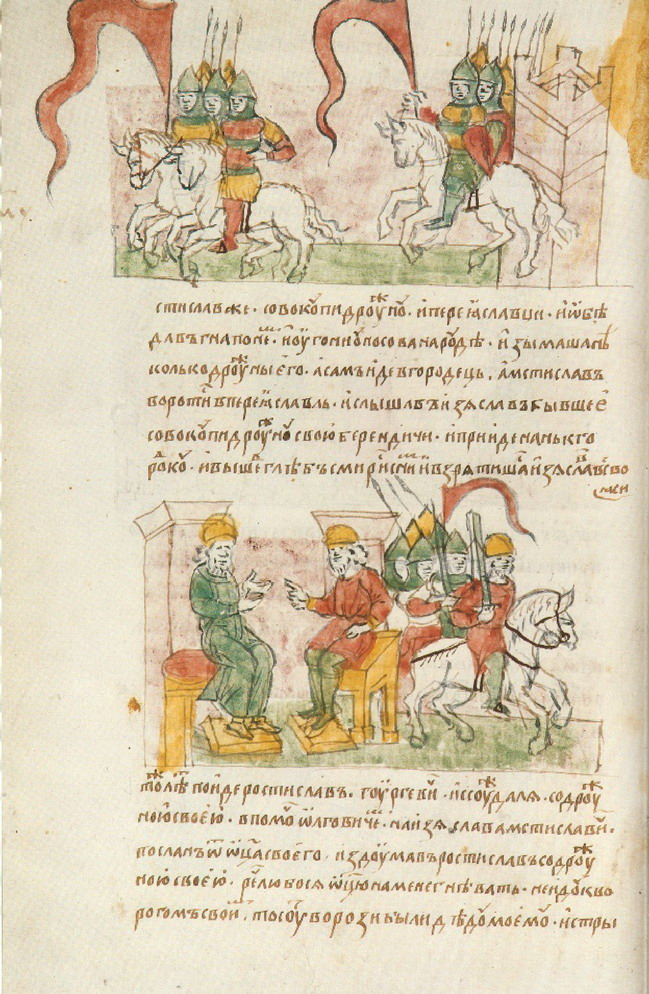
359

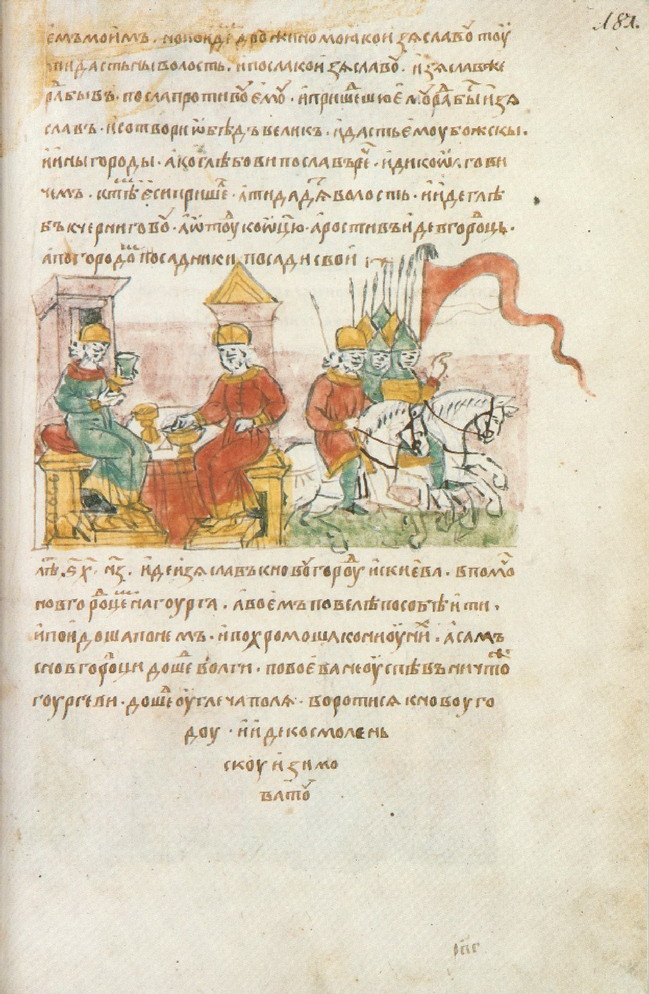
360

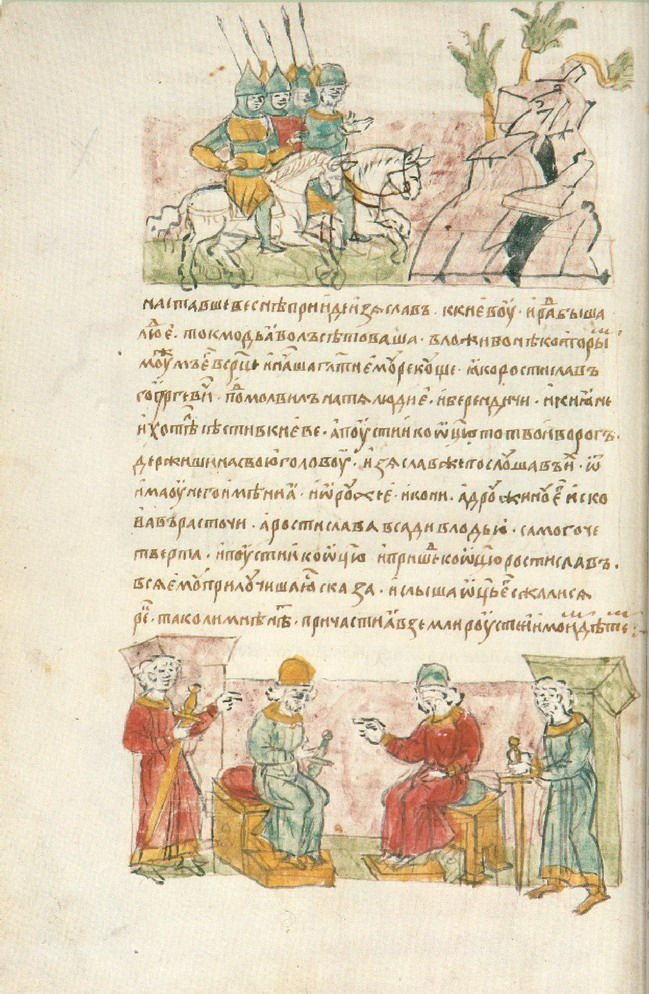
361

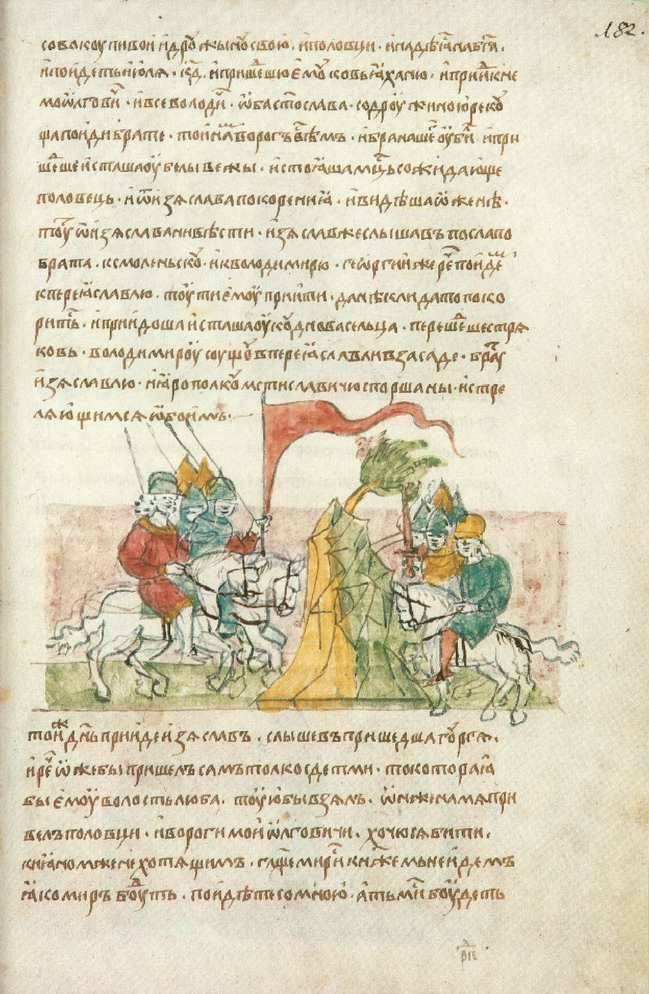
362

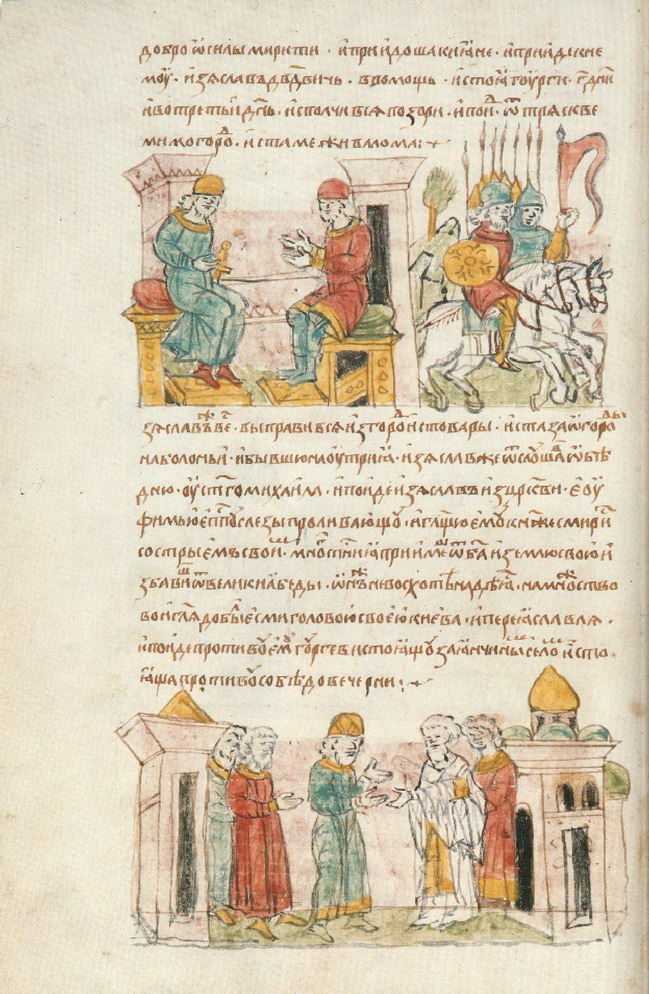
363

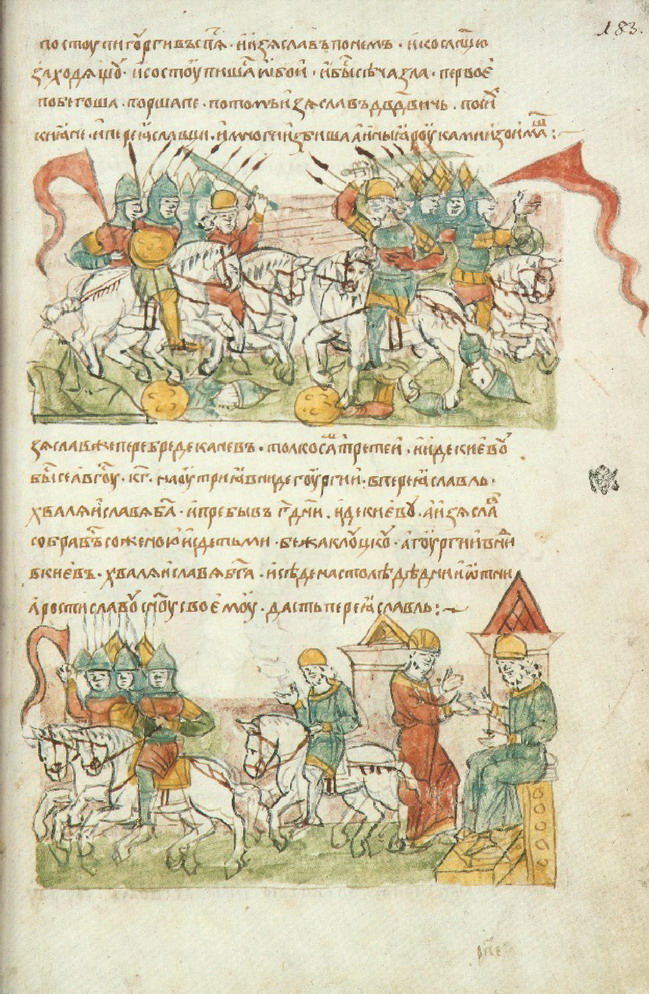
364

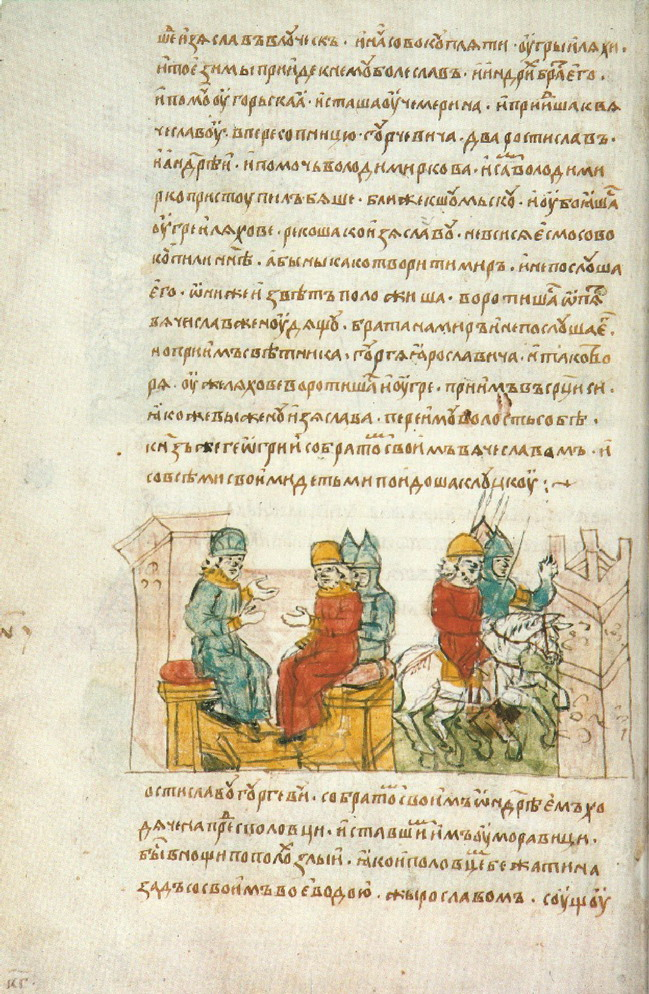
365

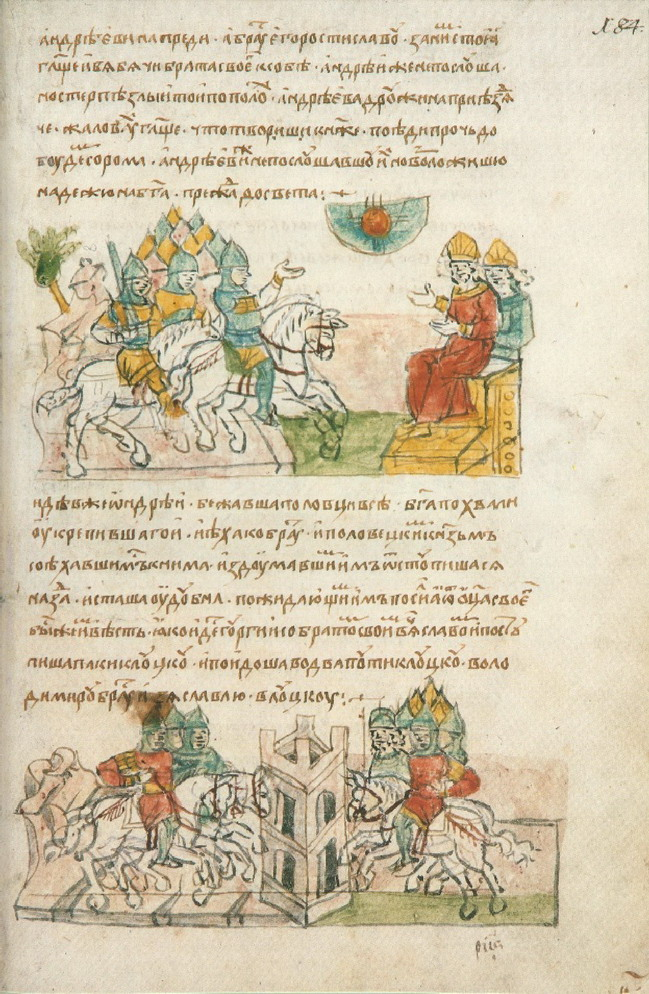
366

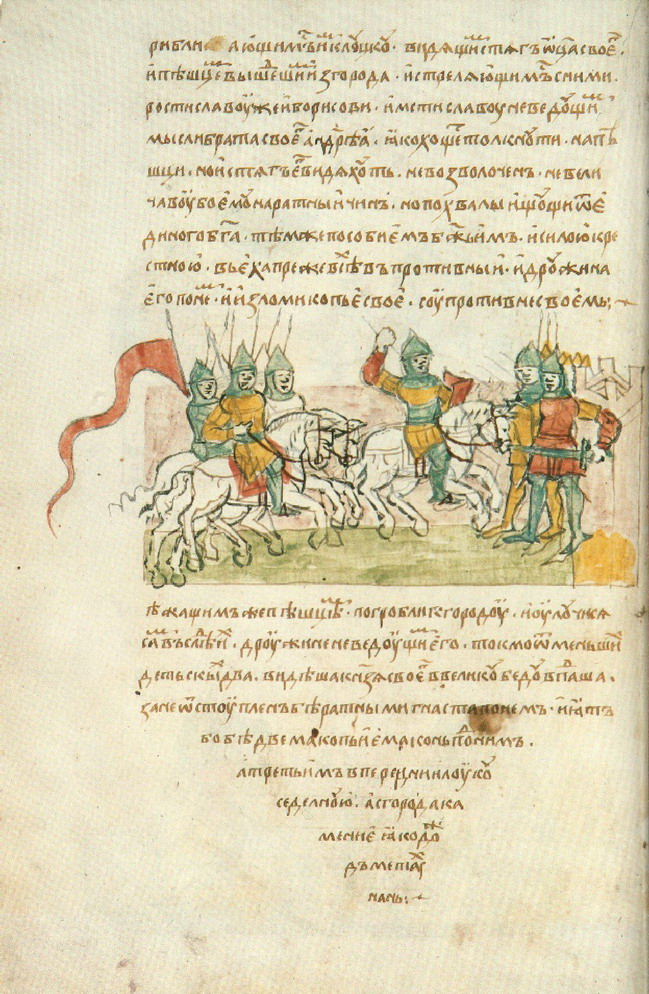
367

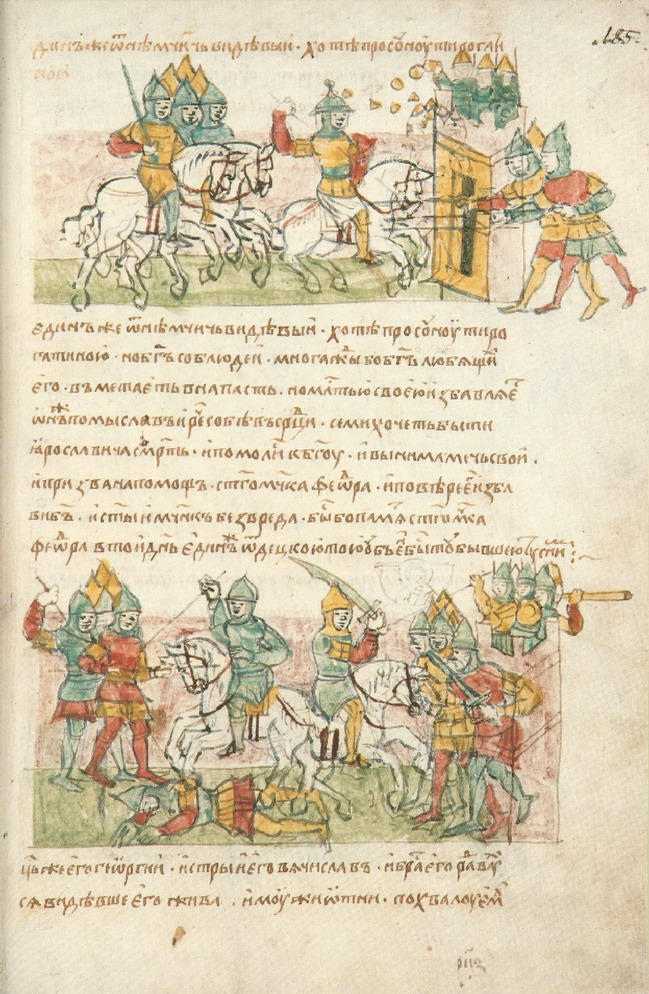
368

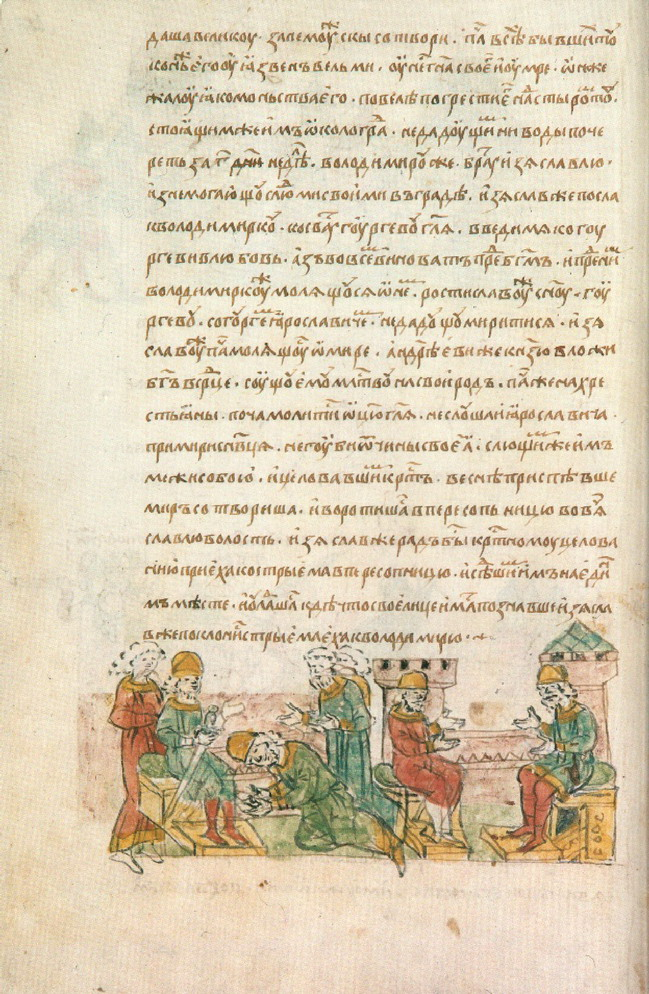
369

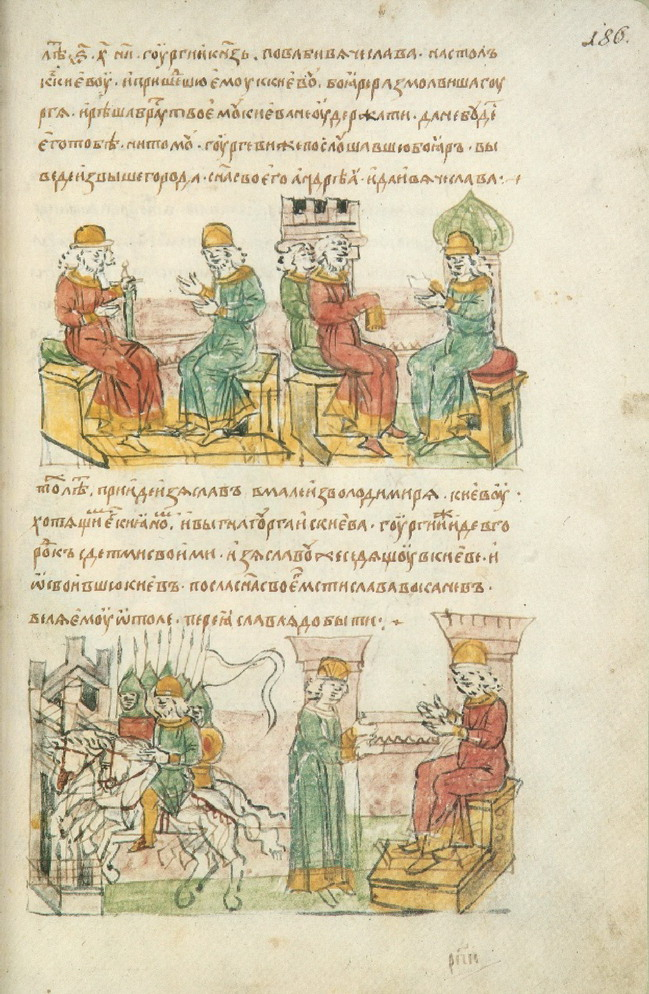
370

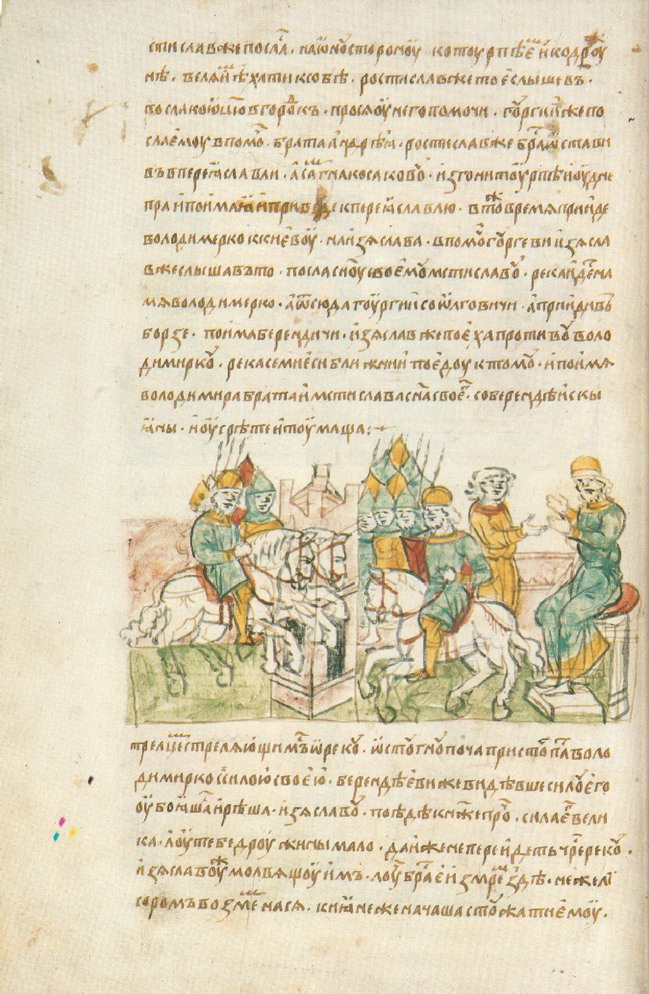
371

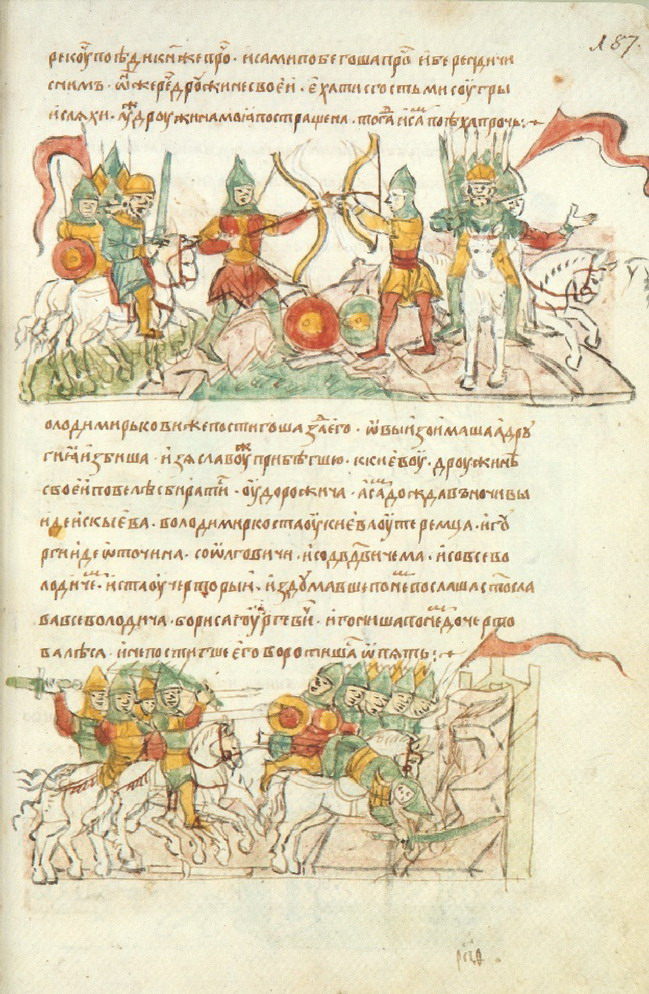
372

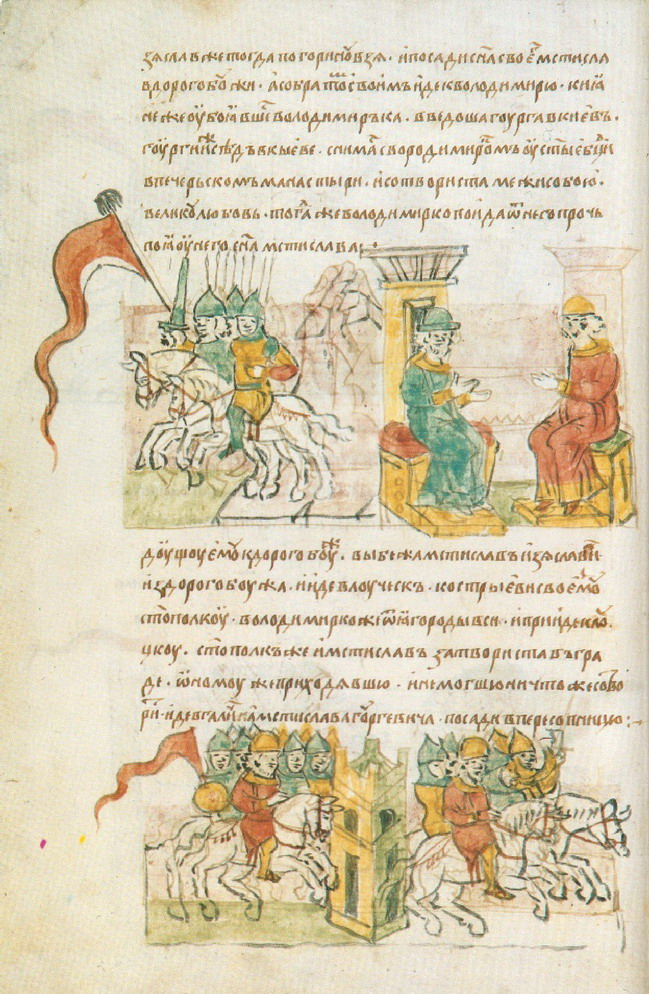
373

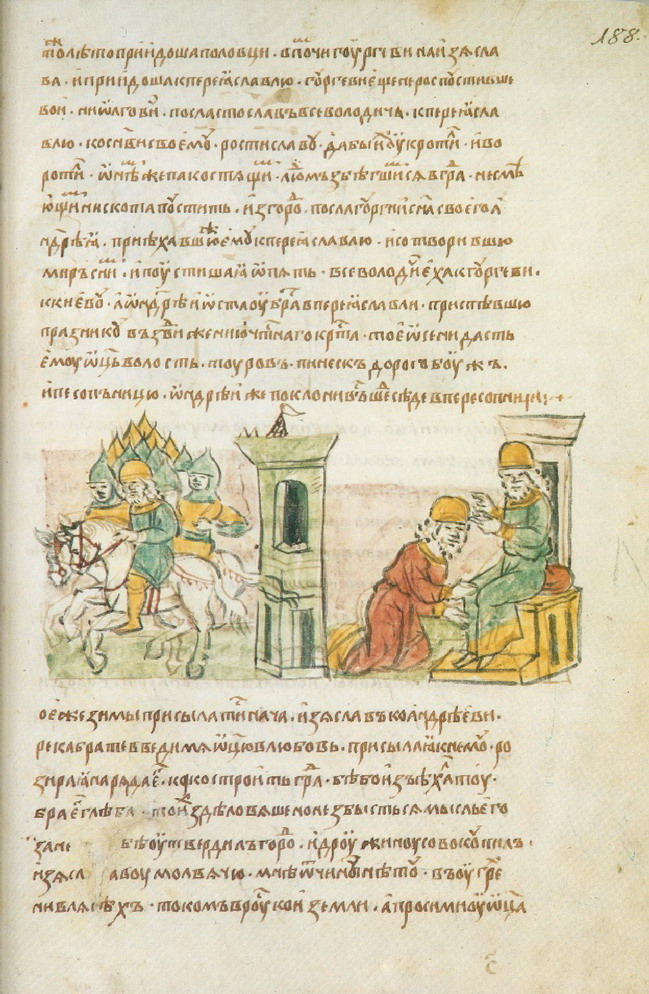
374

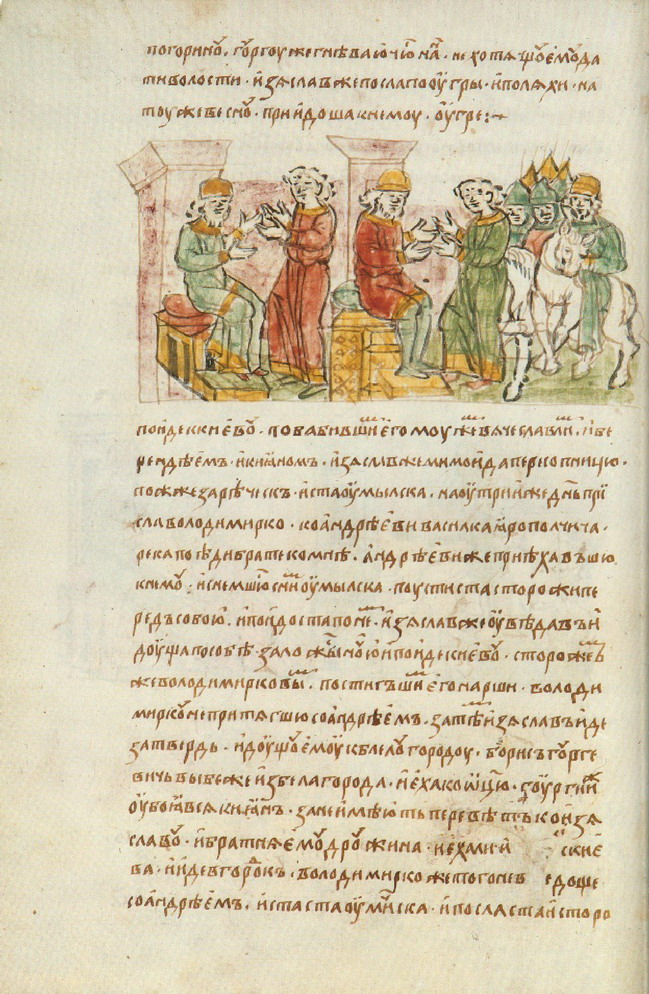
375

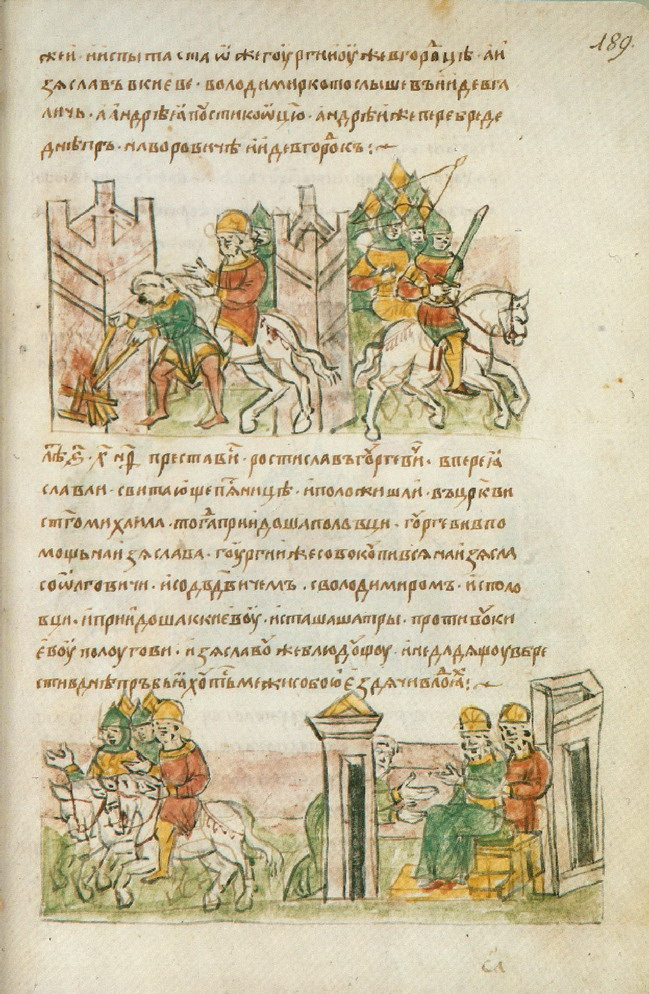
376

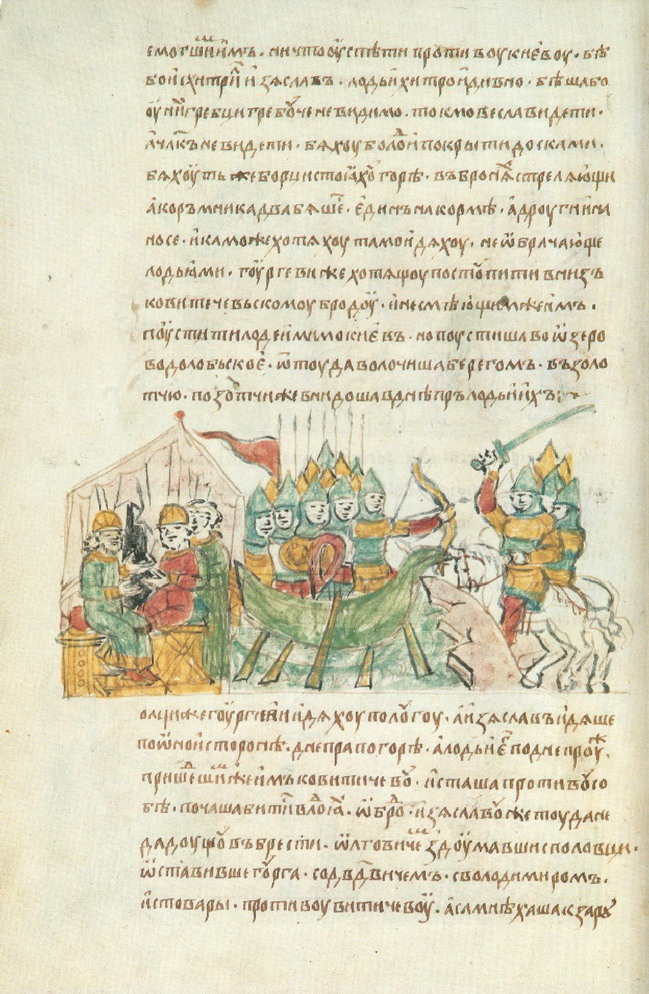
377

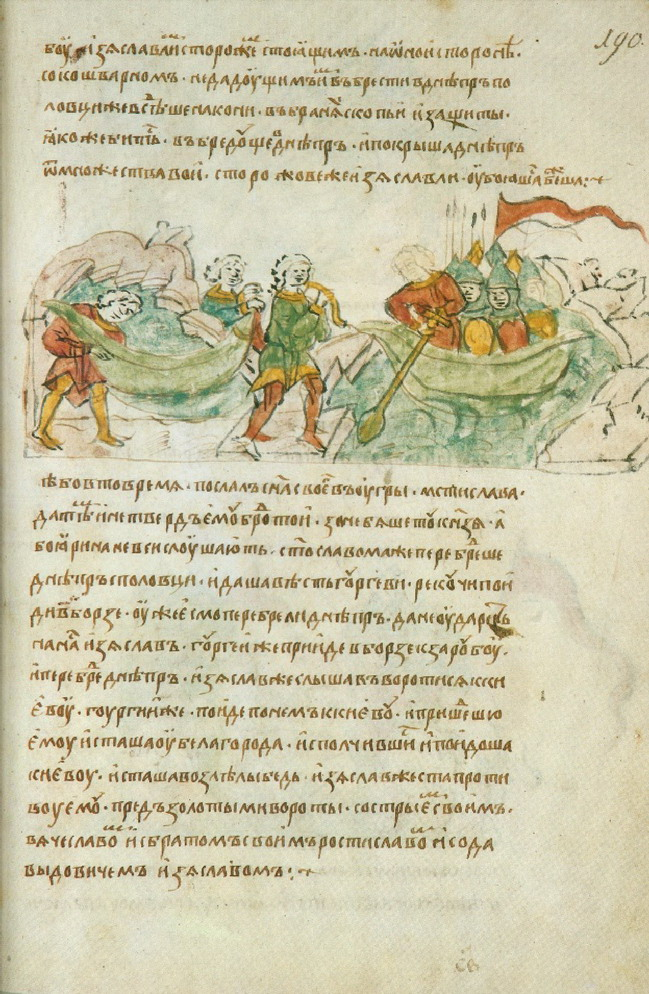
378

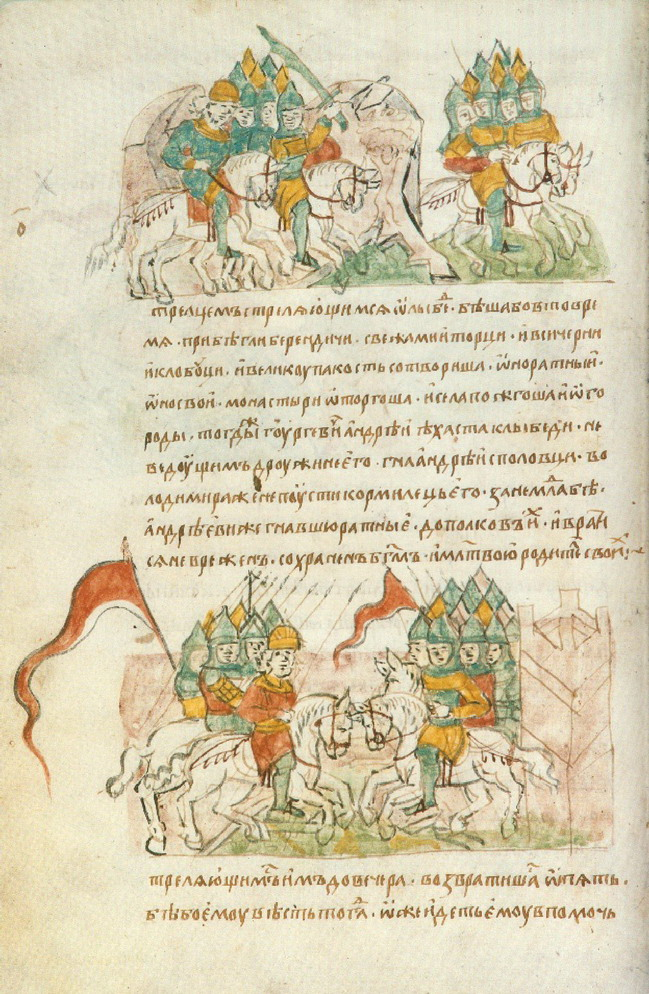
379

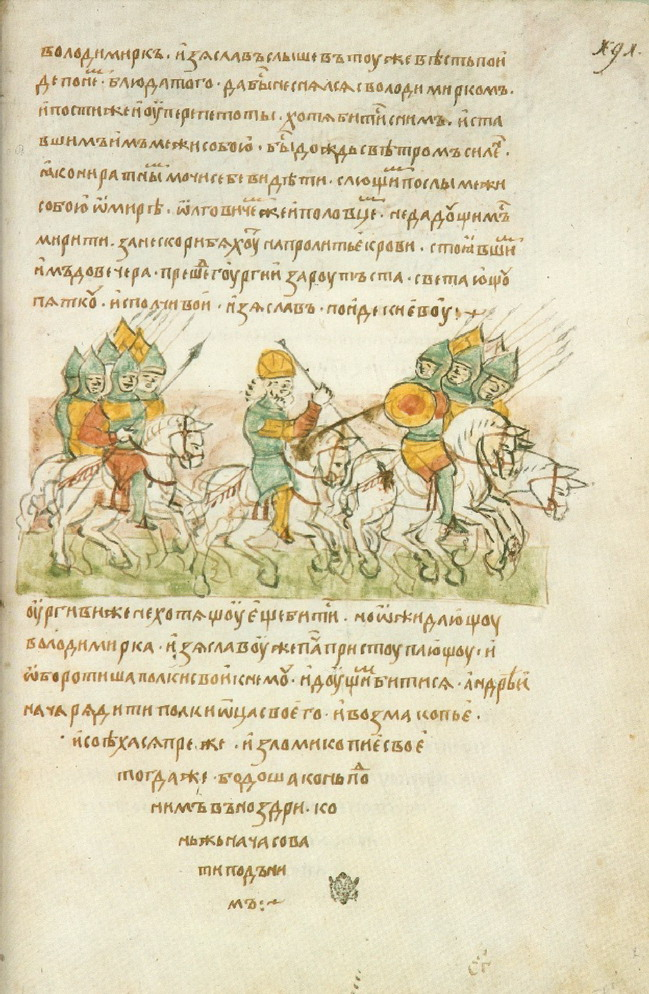
380

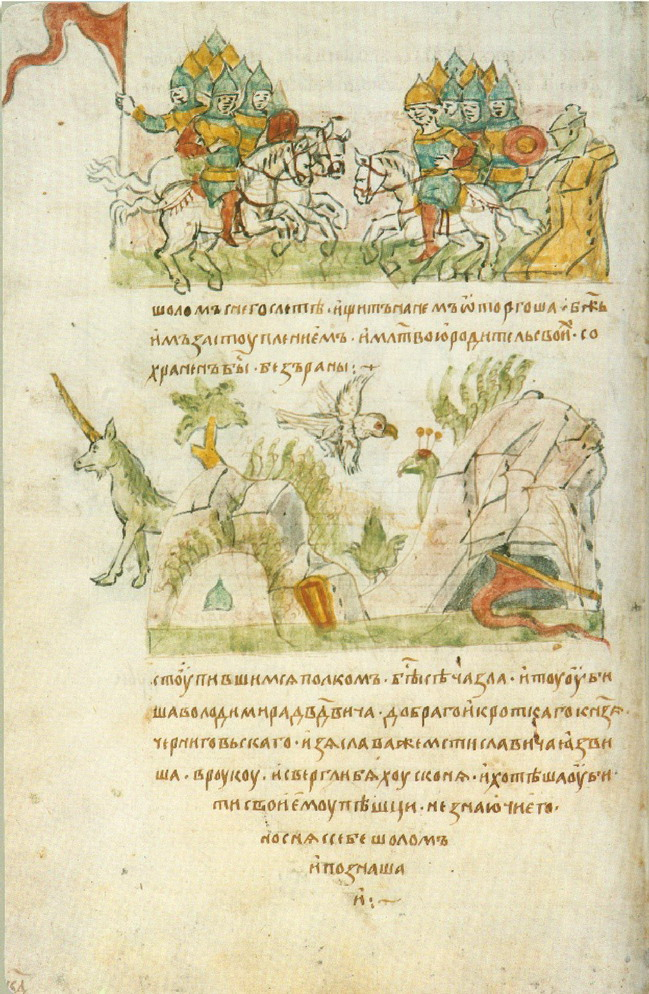
381

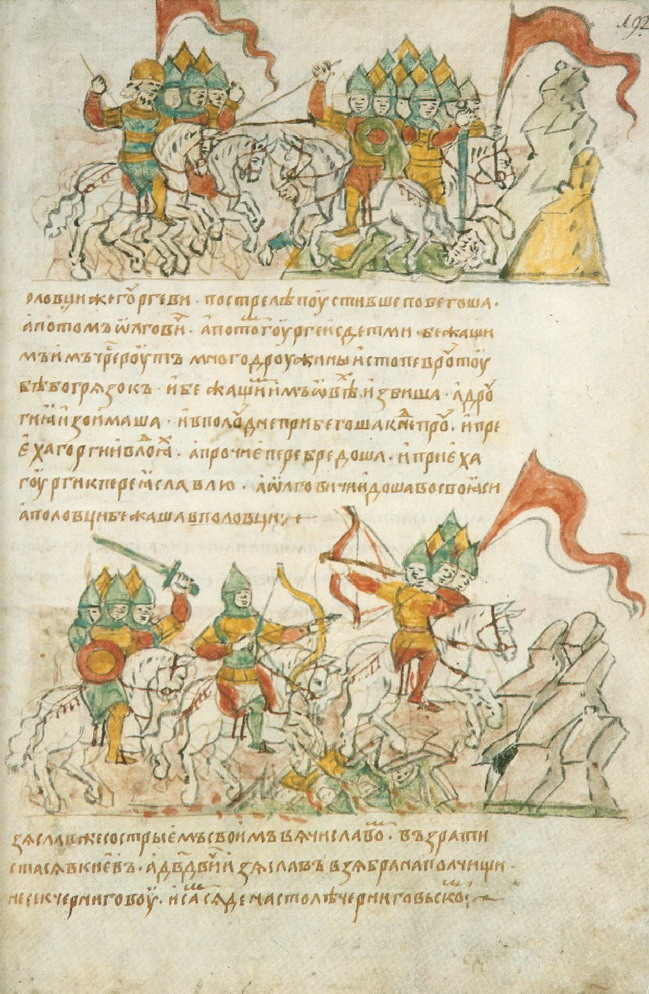
382

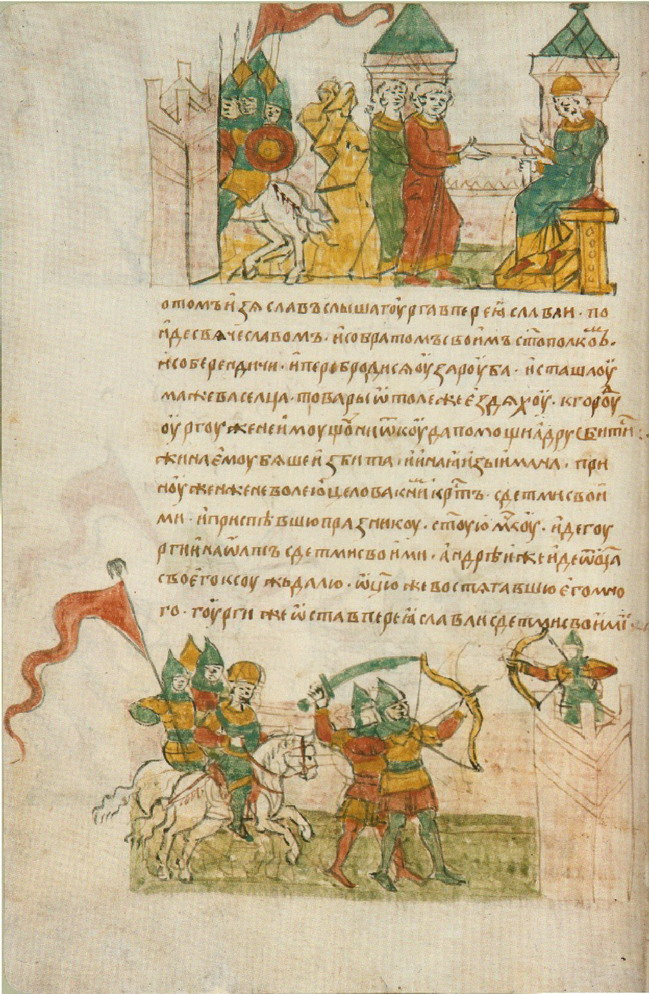
383

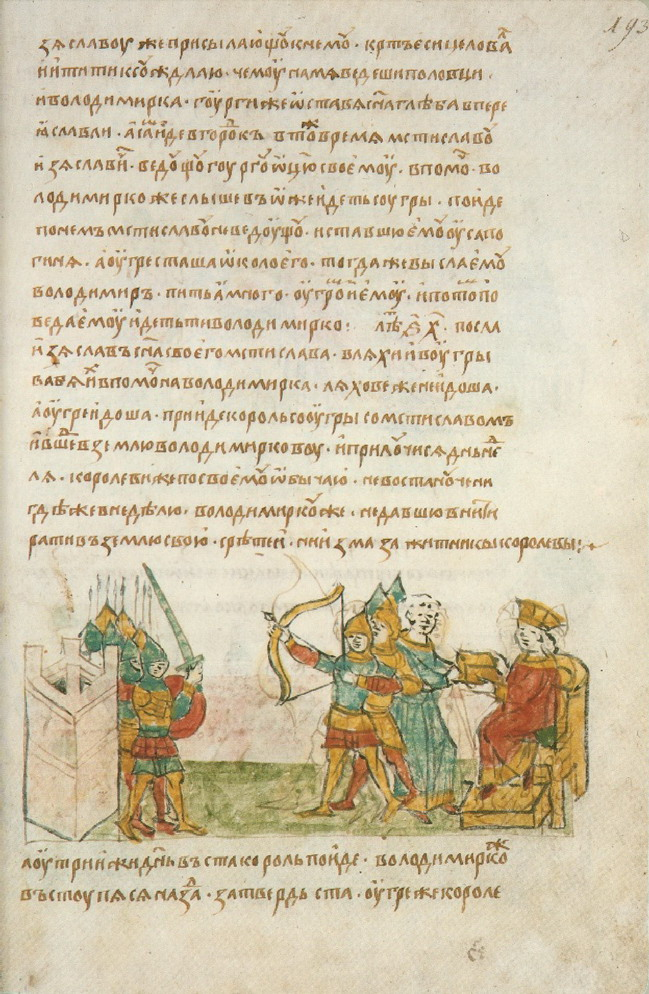
384

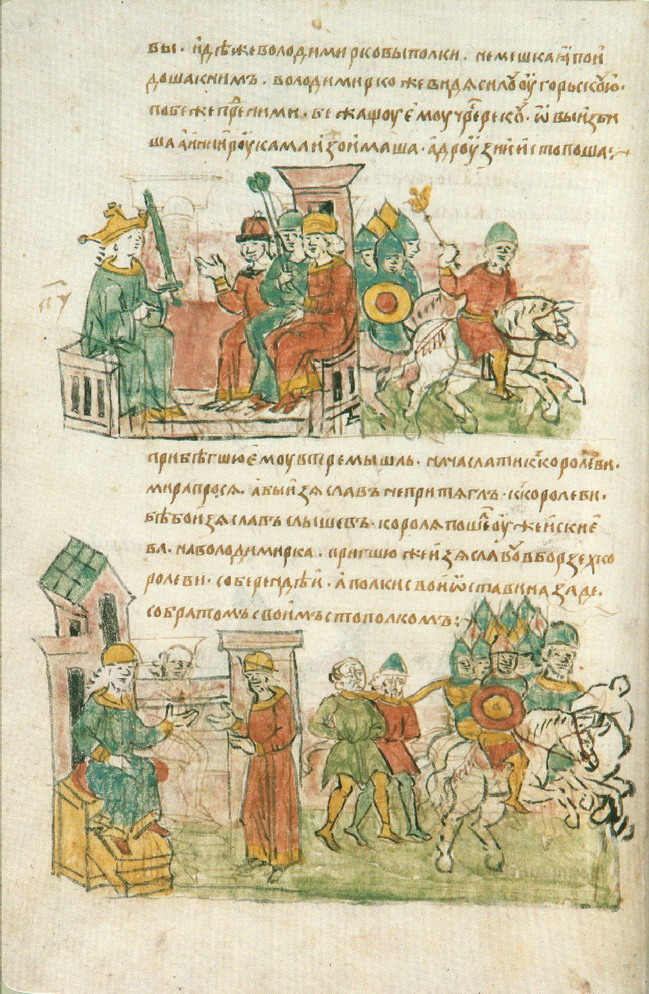
385

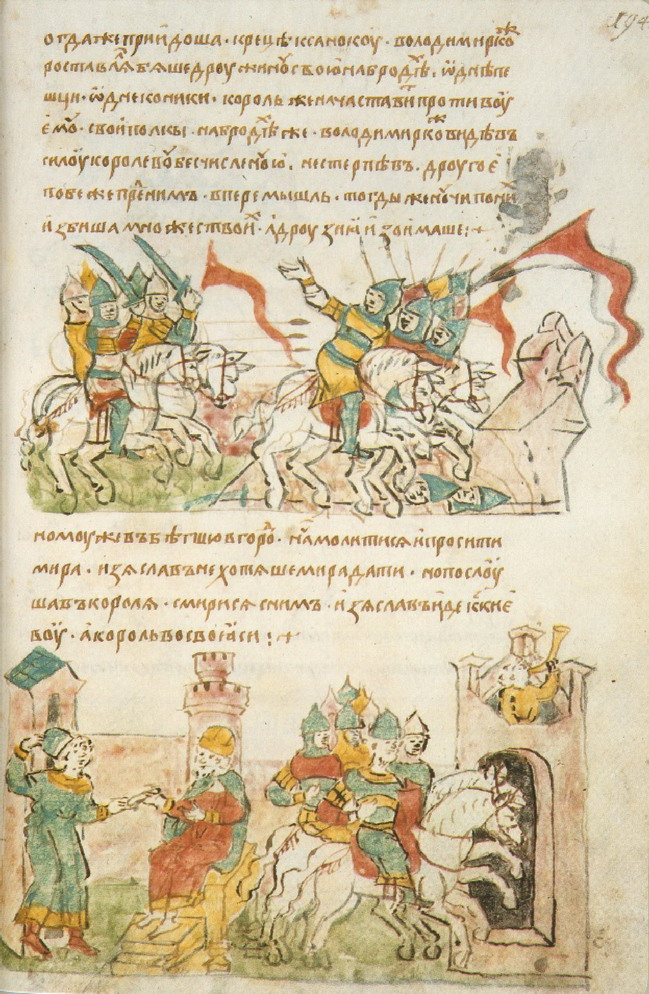
386

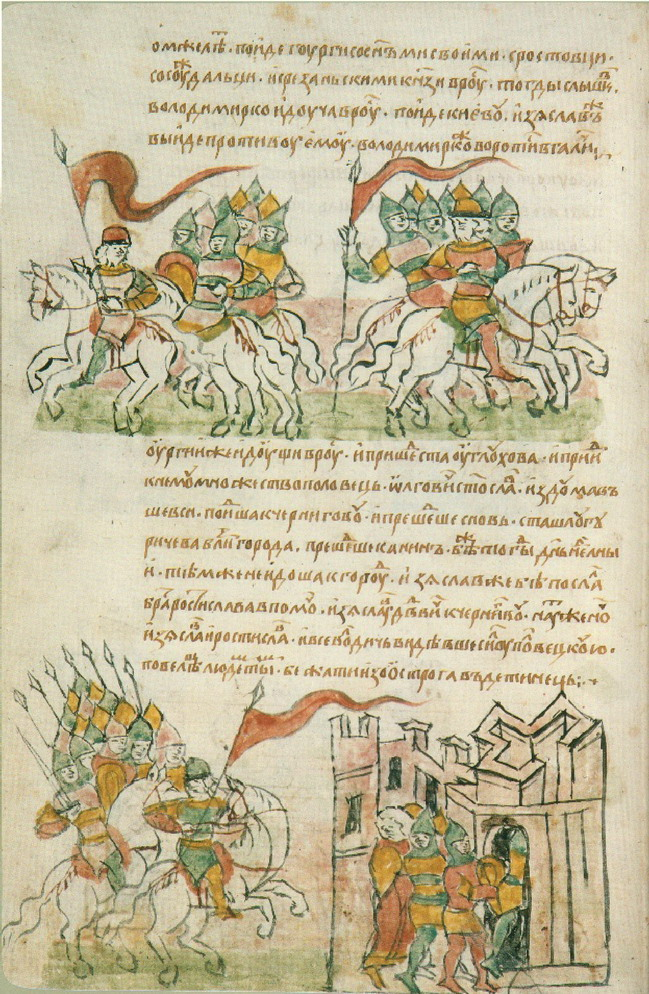
387

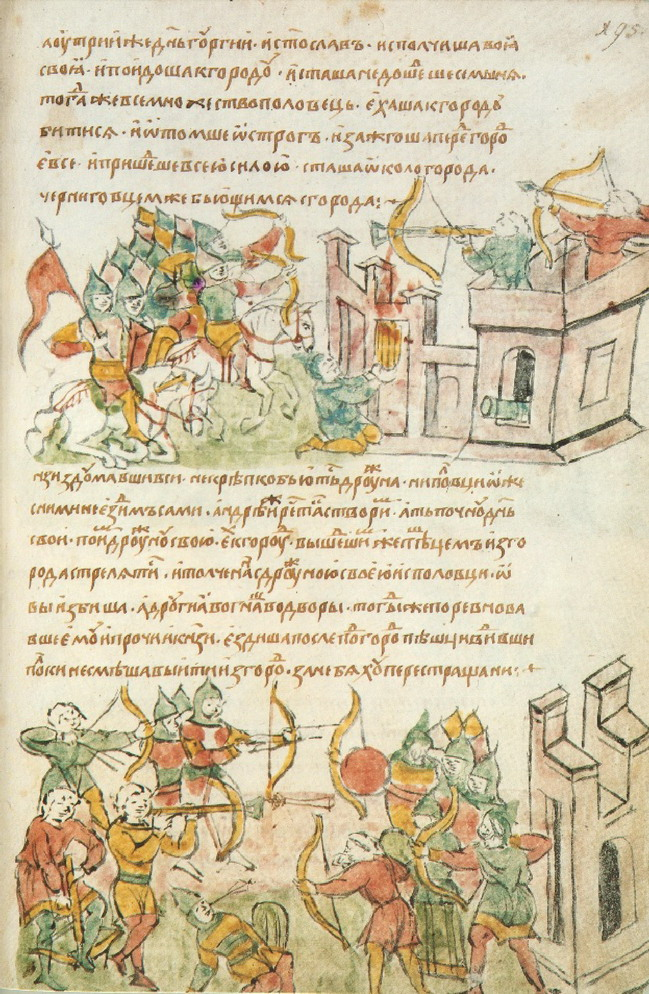
388

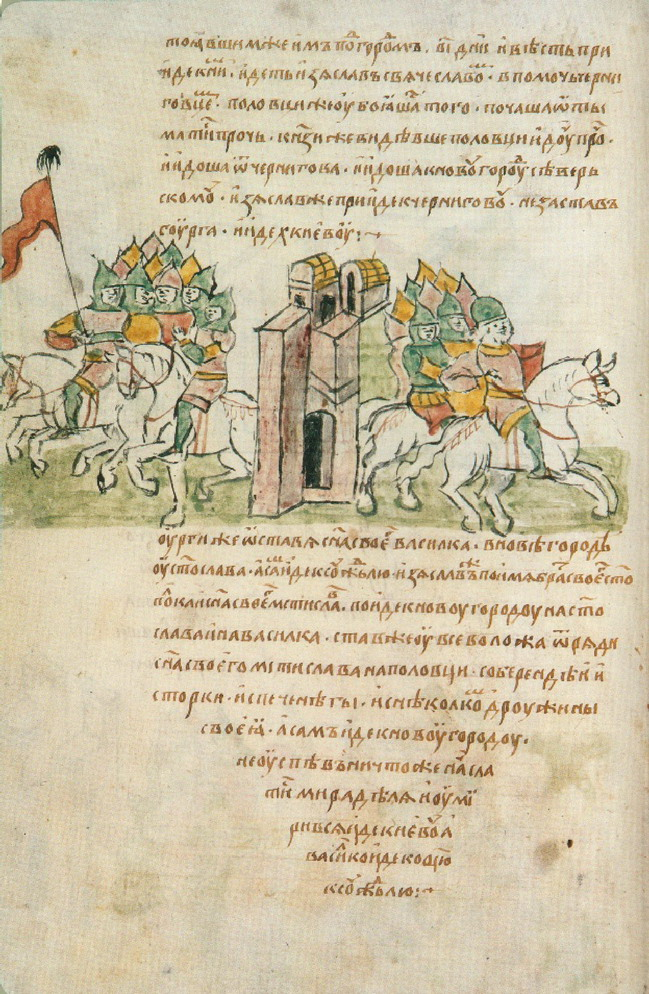
389

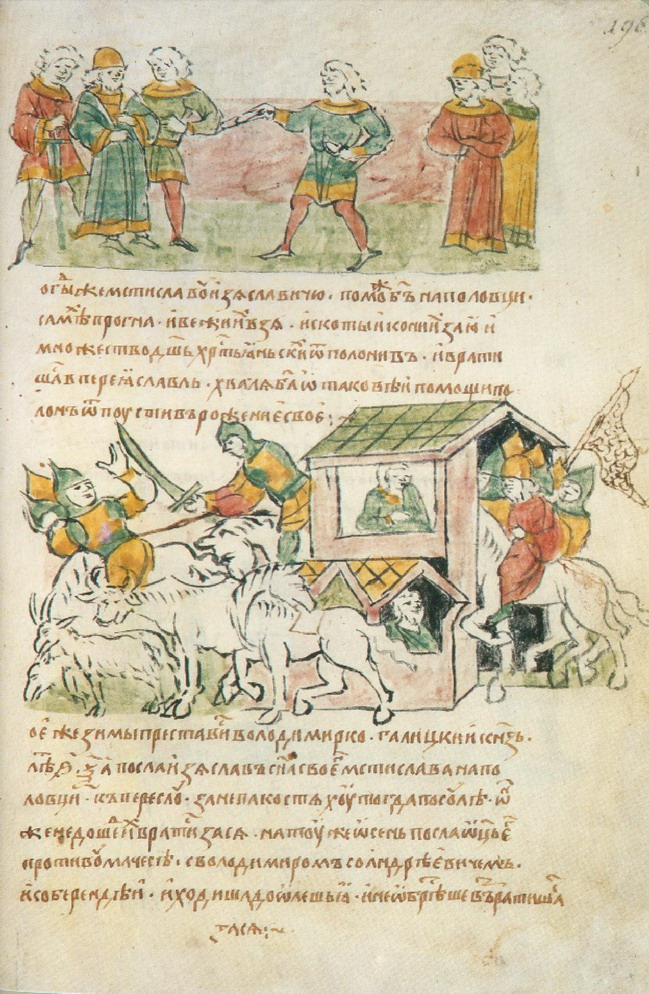
390

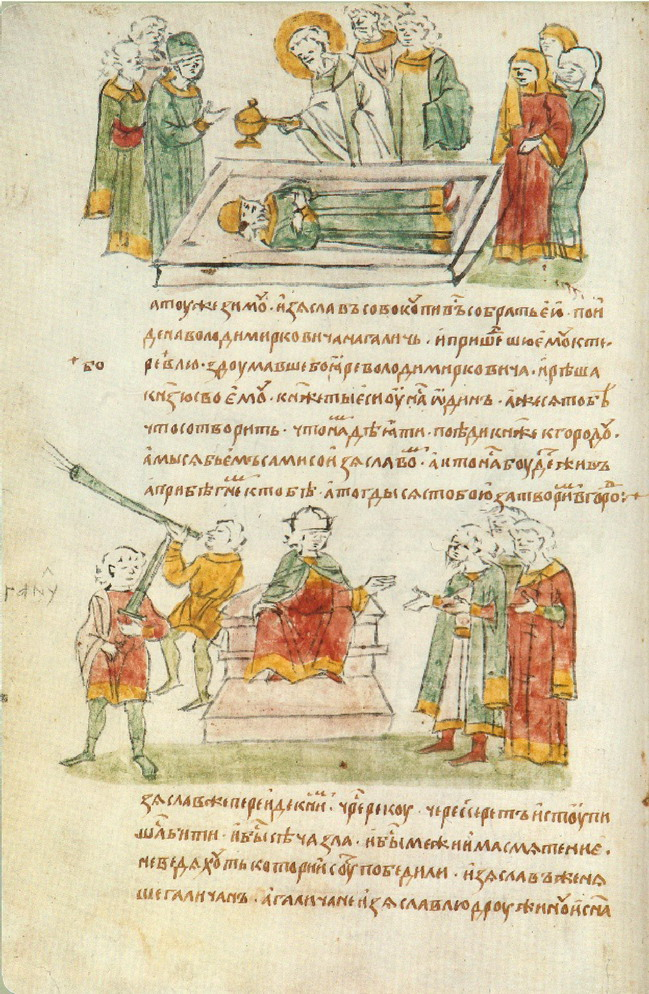
391

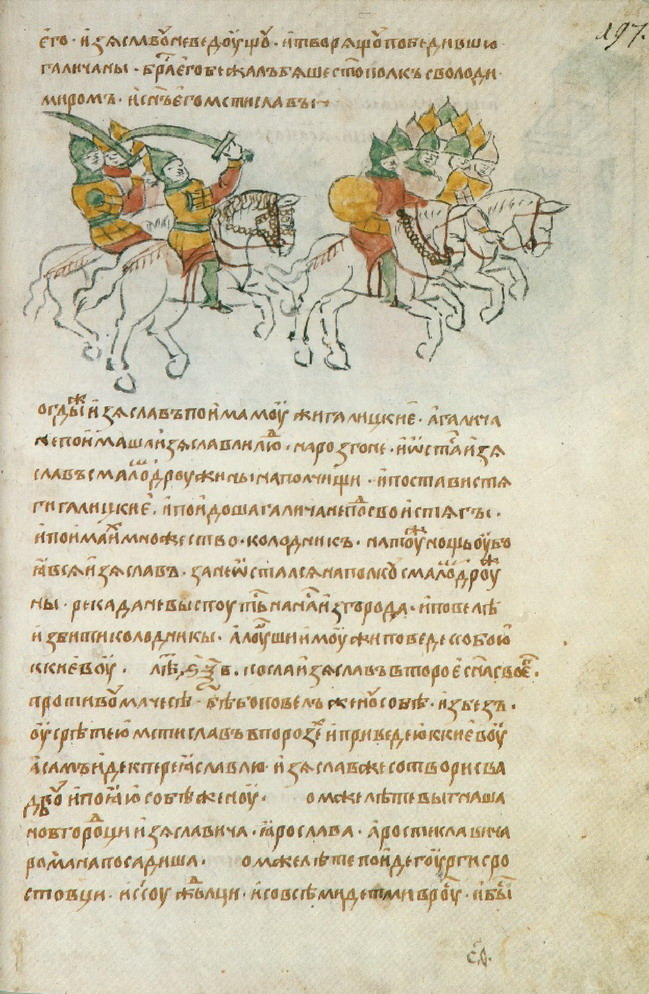
392

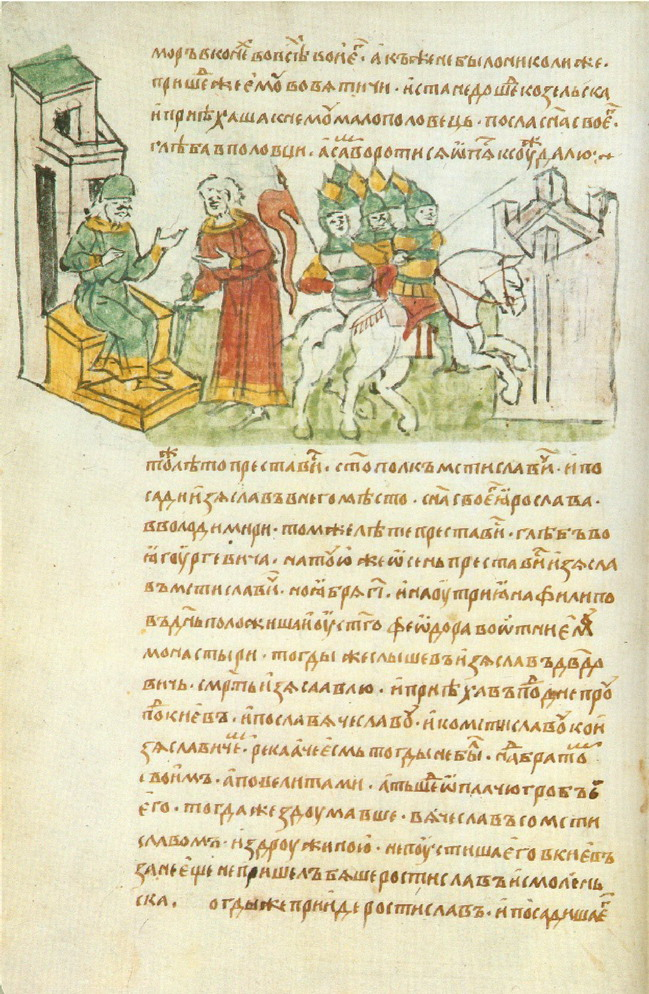
393

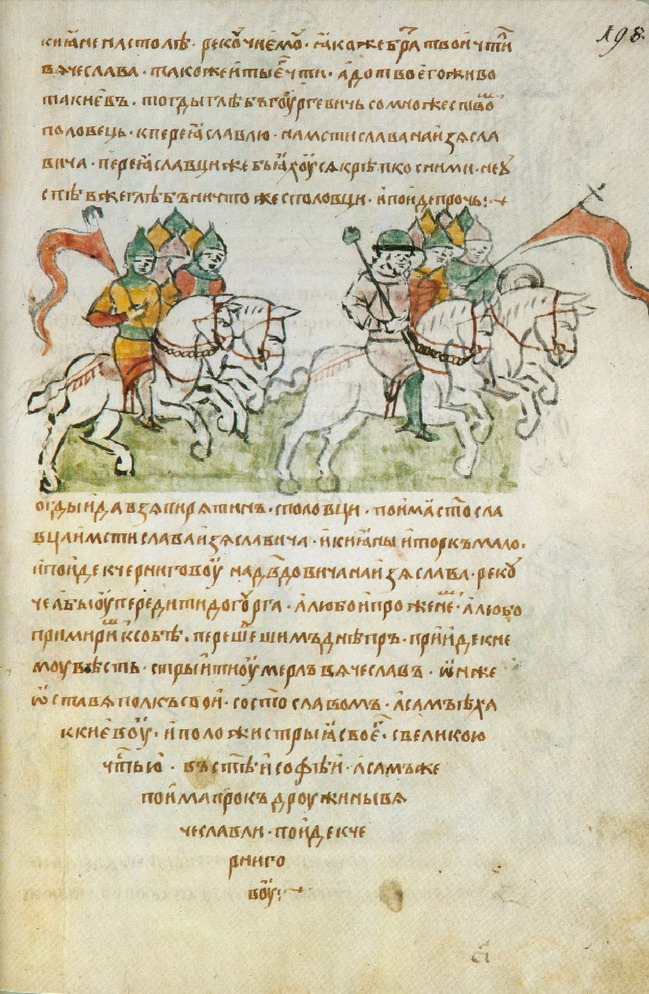
394

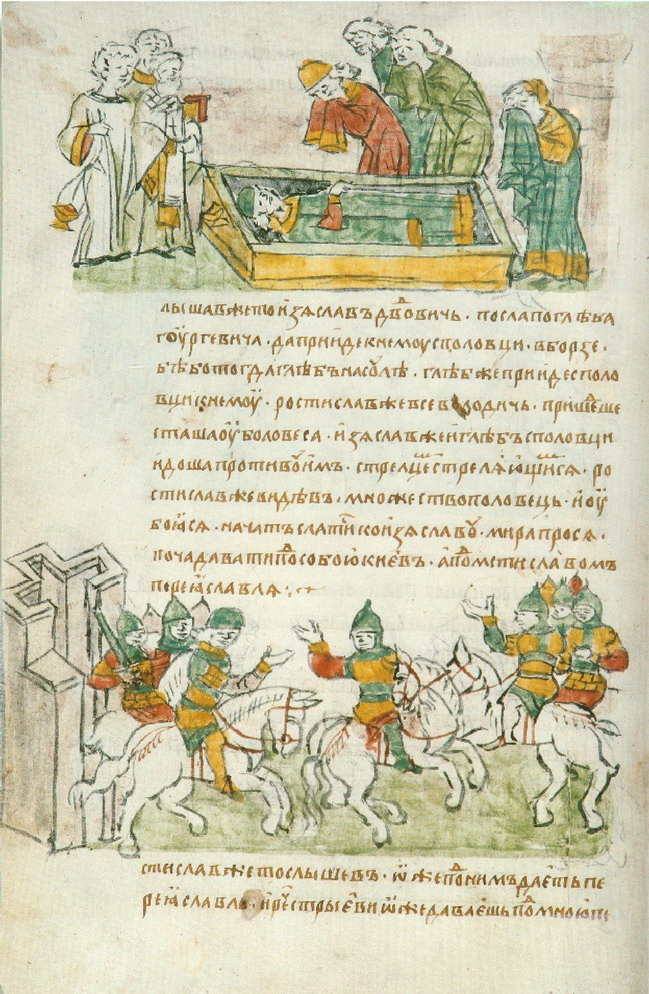
395

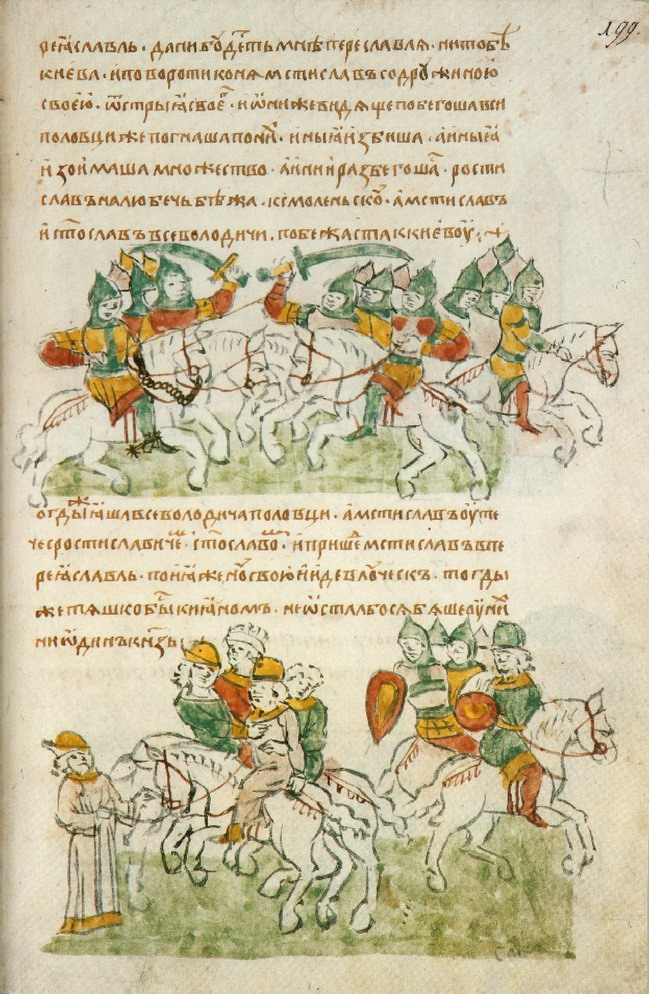
396

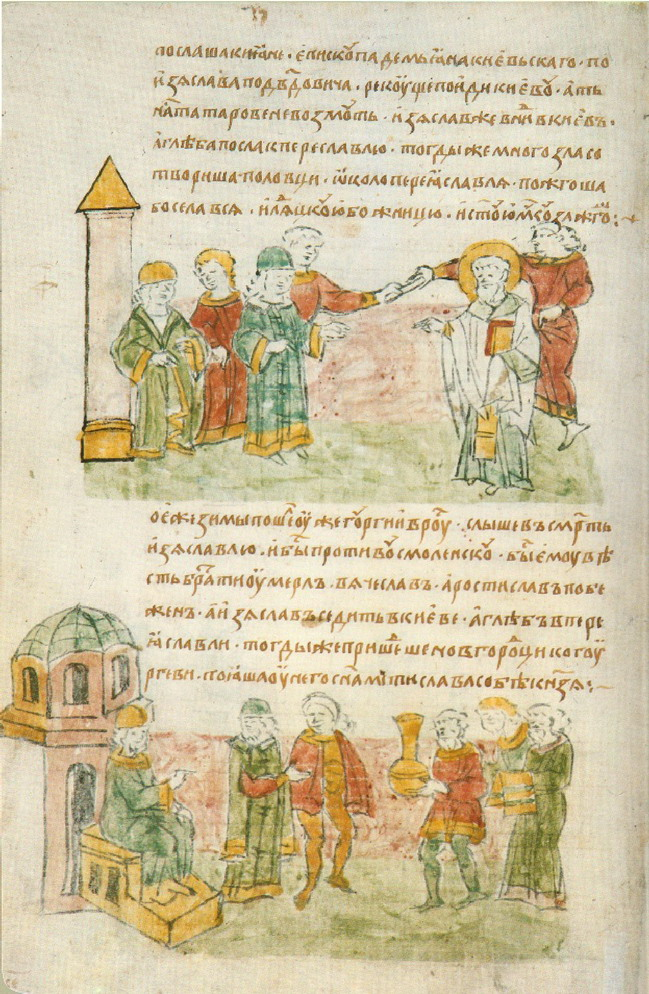
397

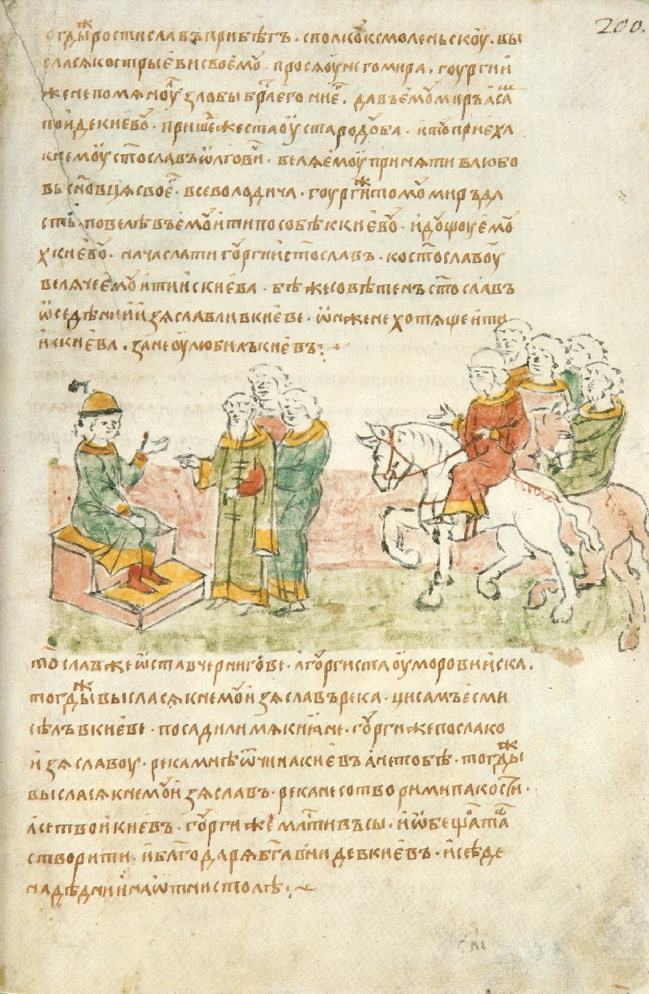
398

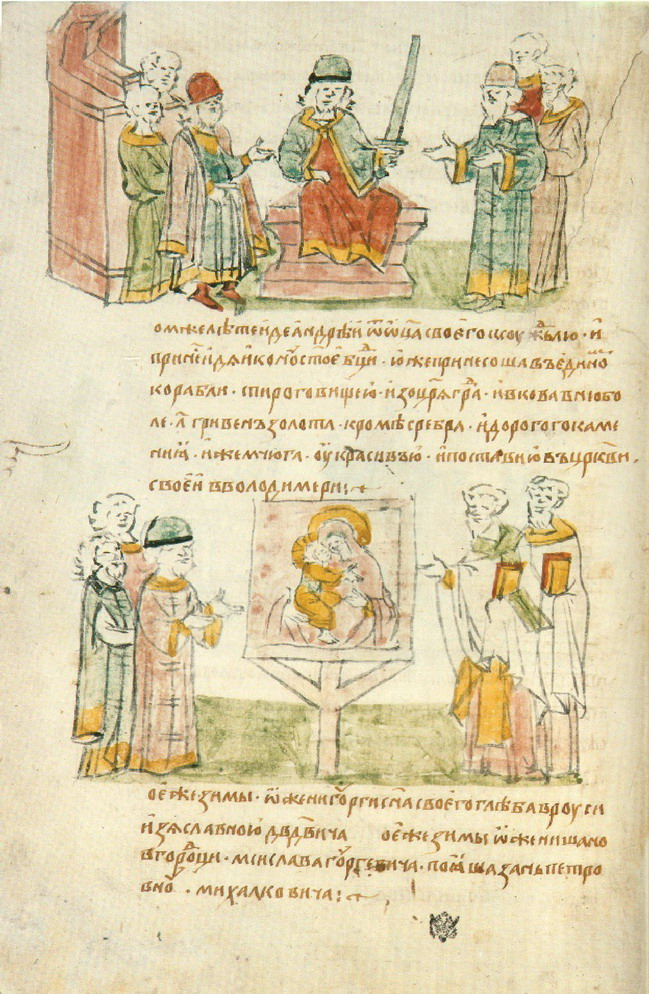
399

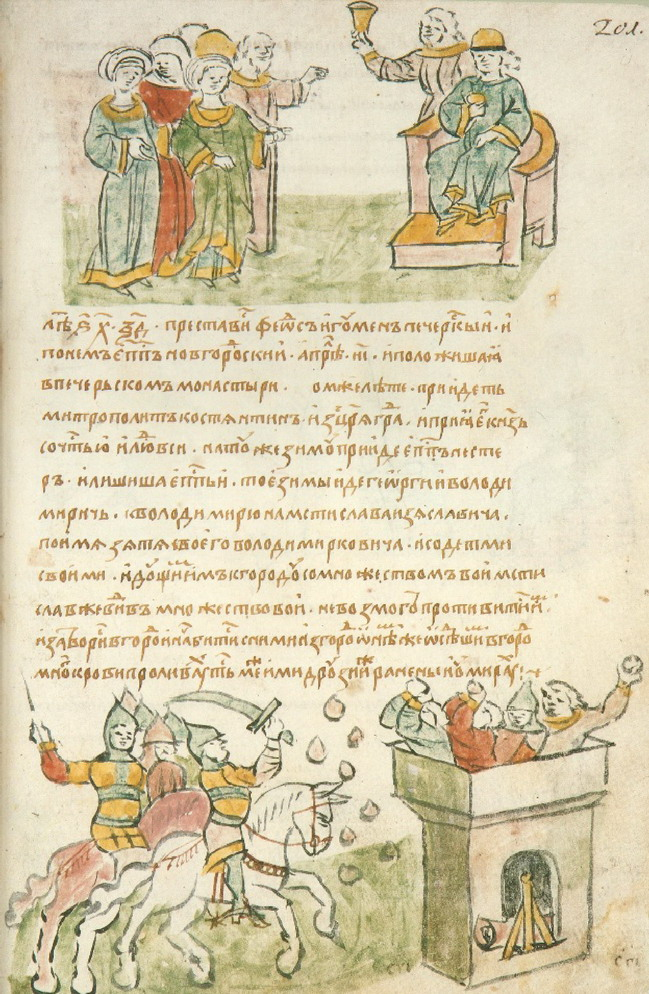
400

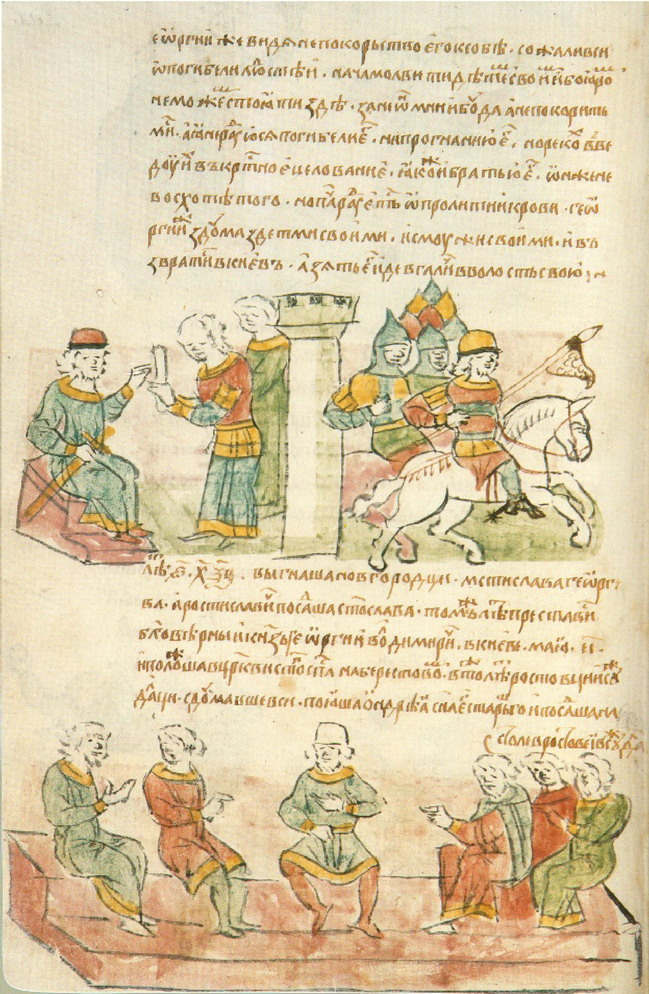
401

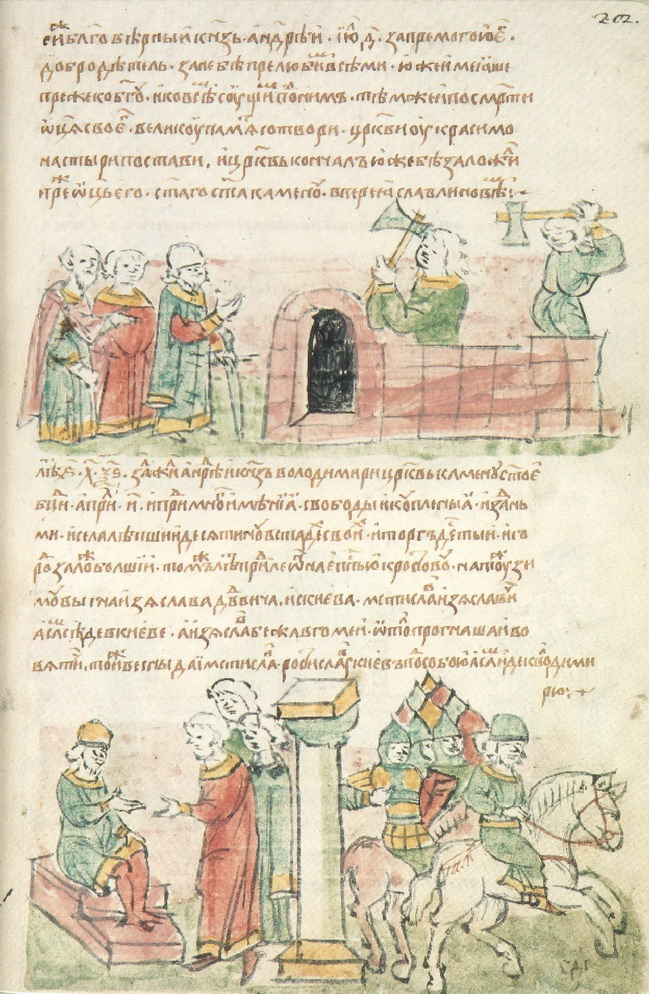
402

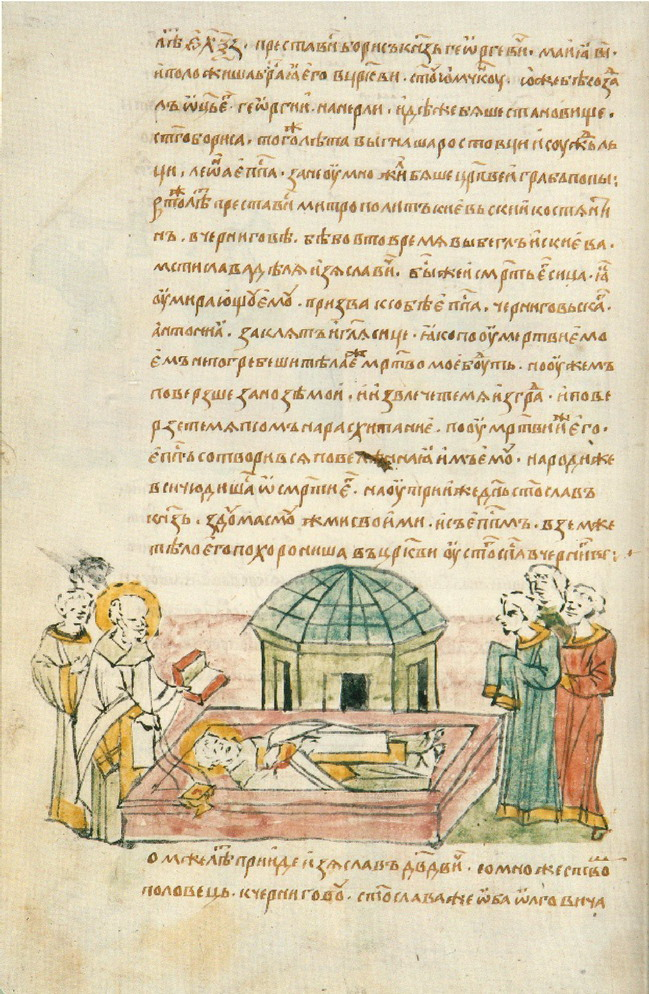
403

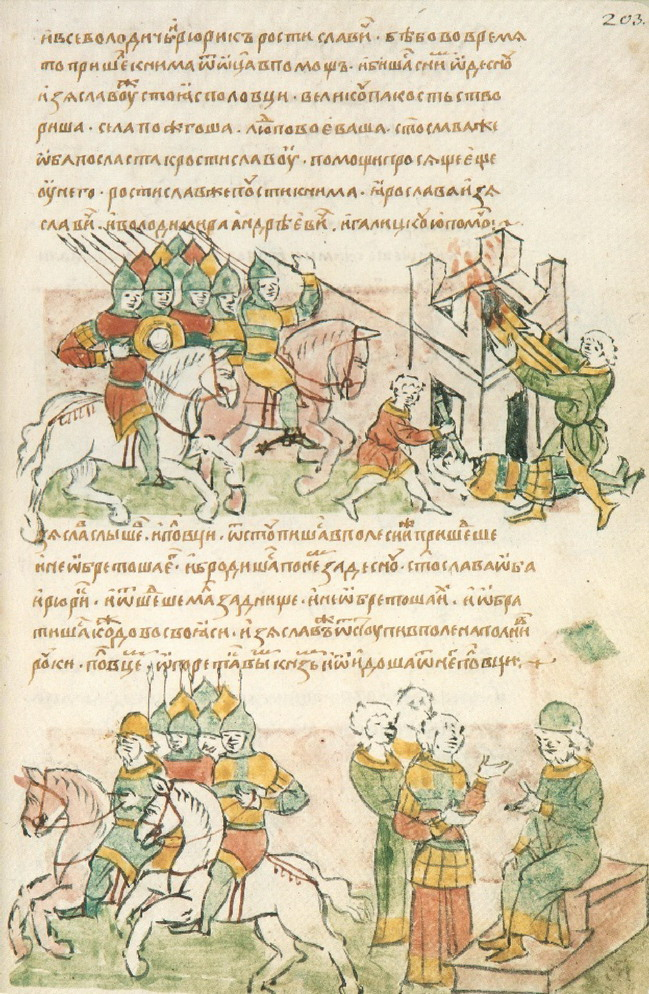
404

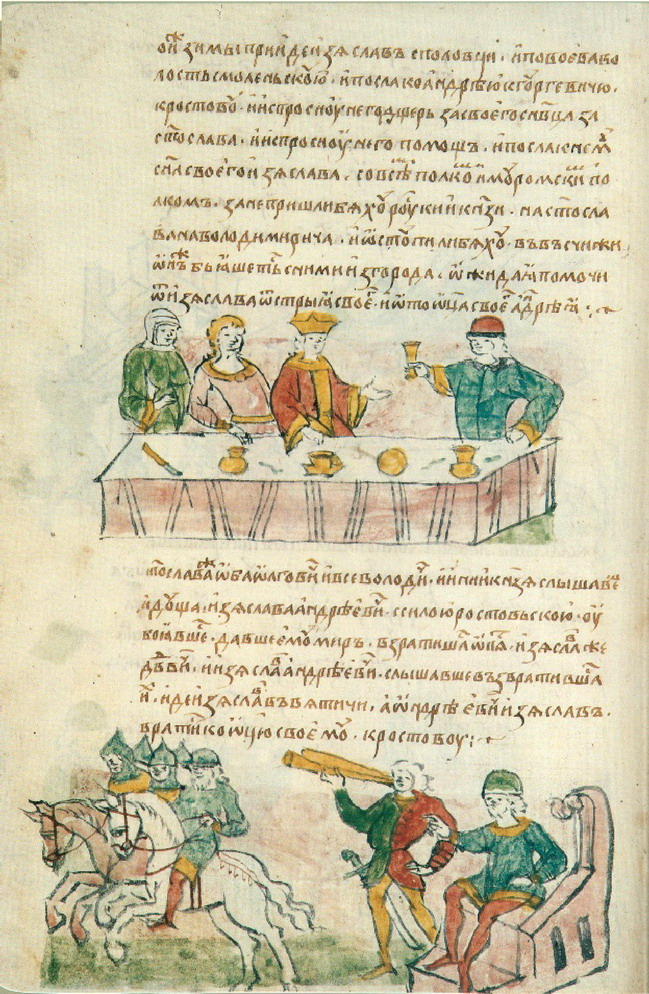
405

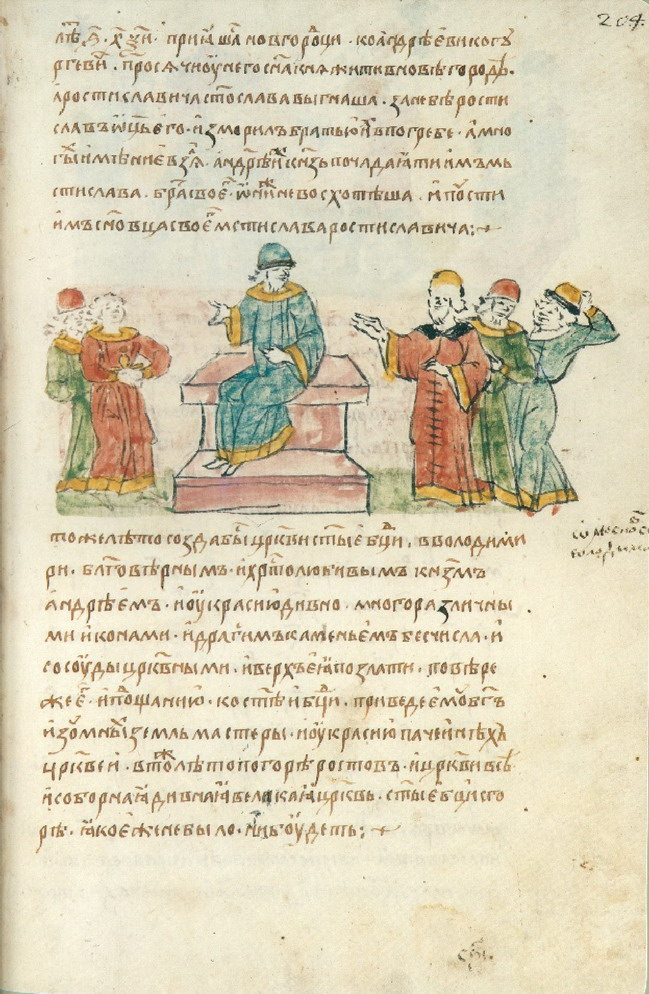
406

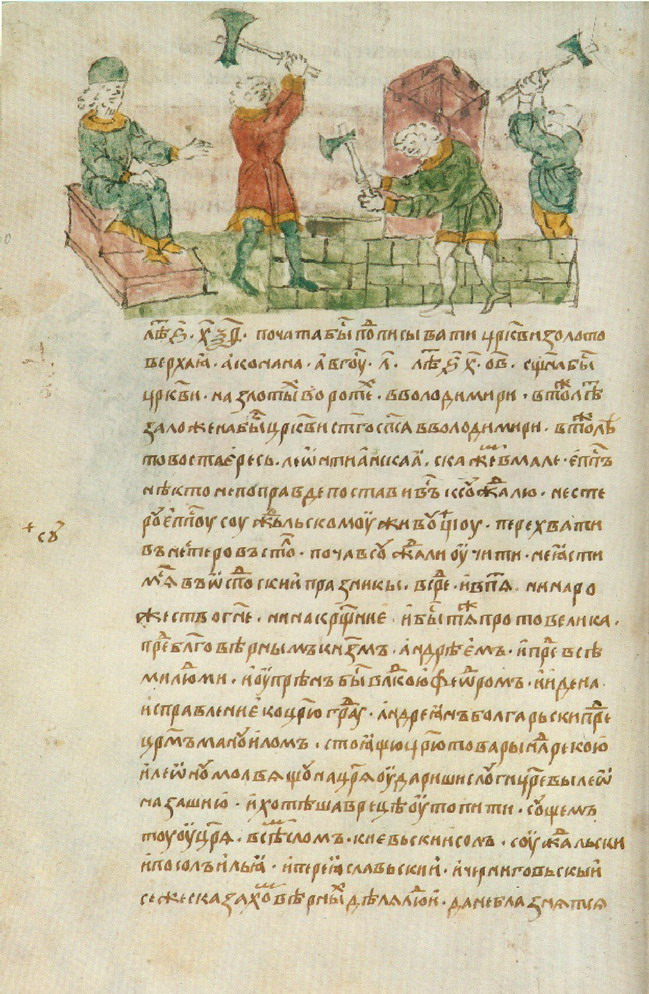
407

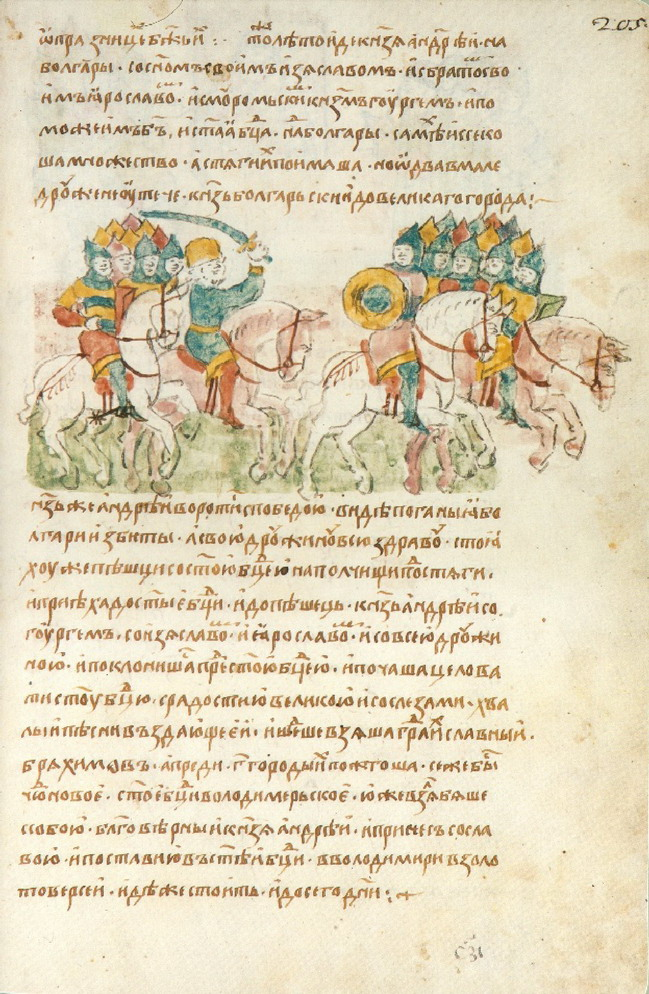
408

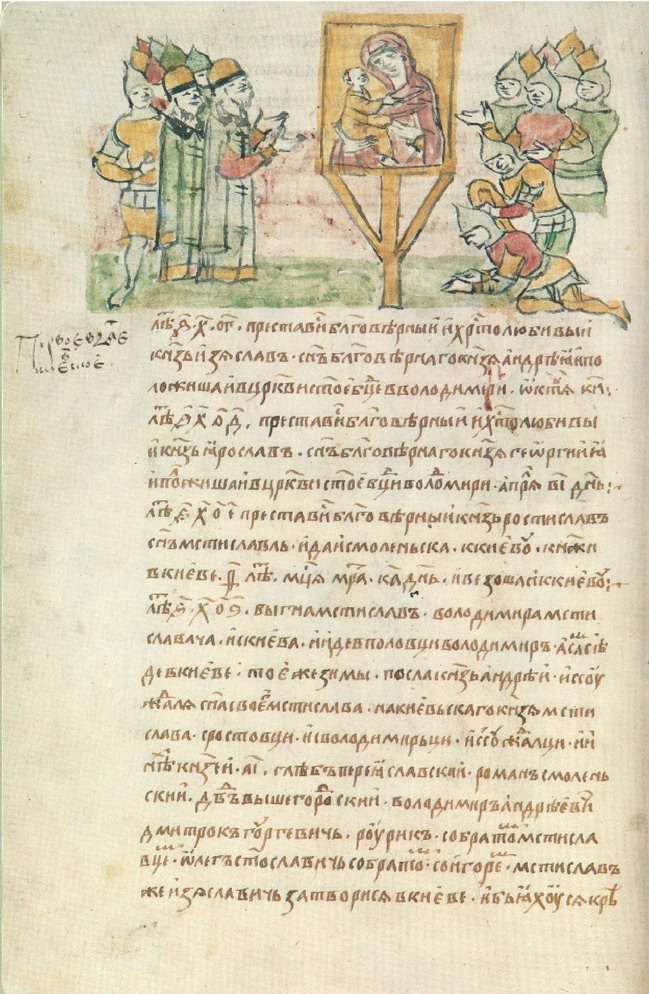
409

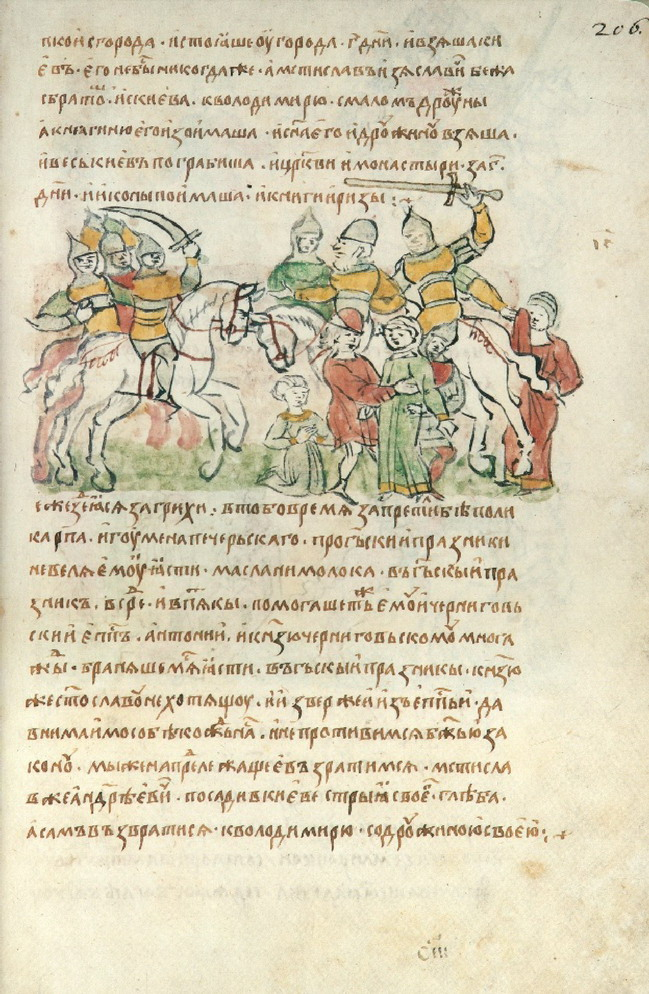
410

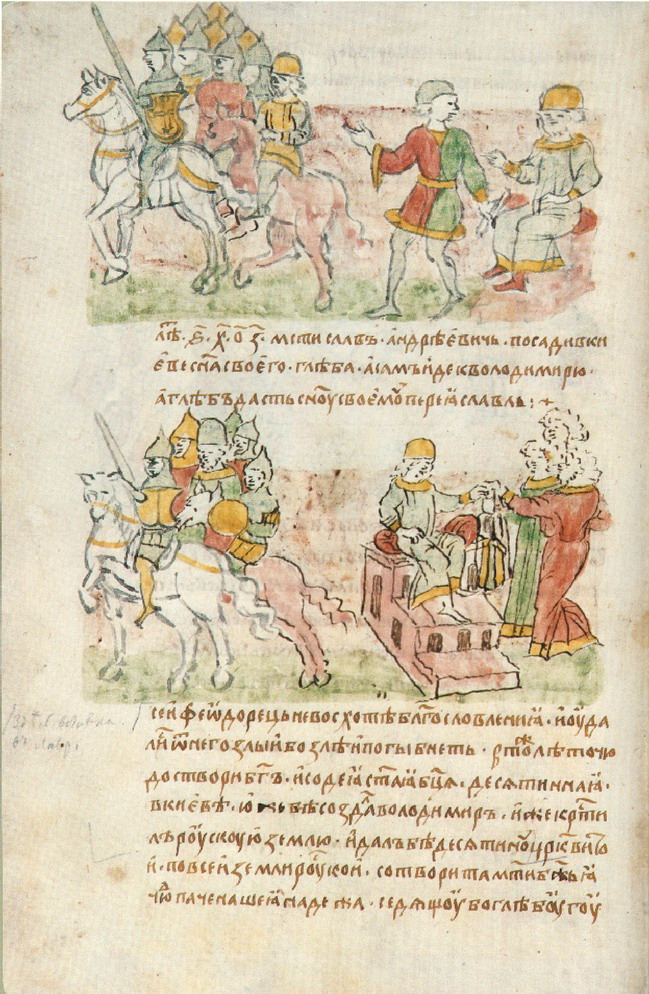
411

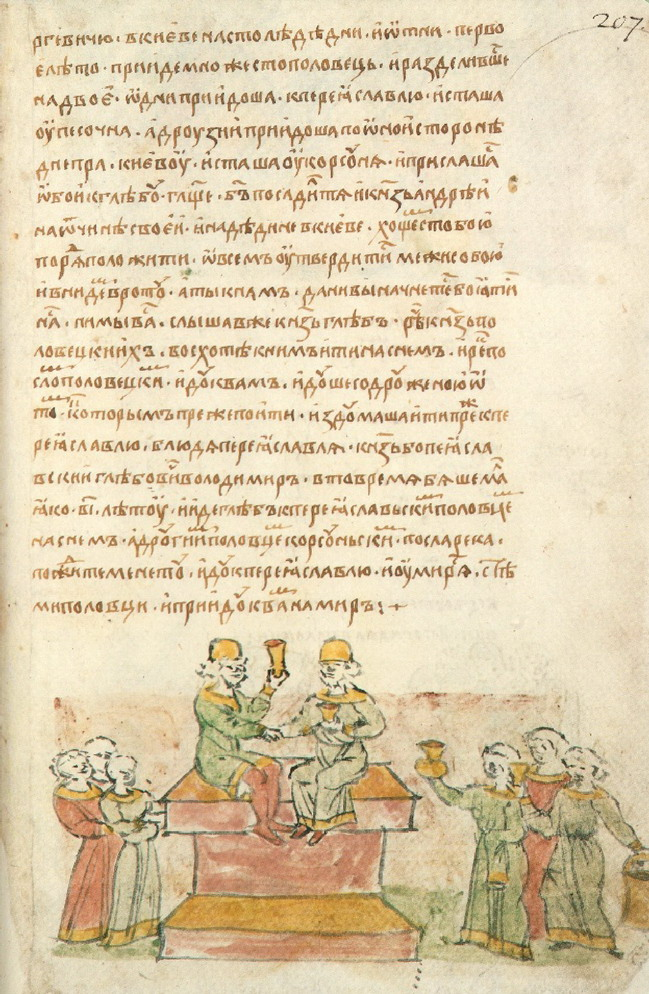
412

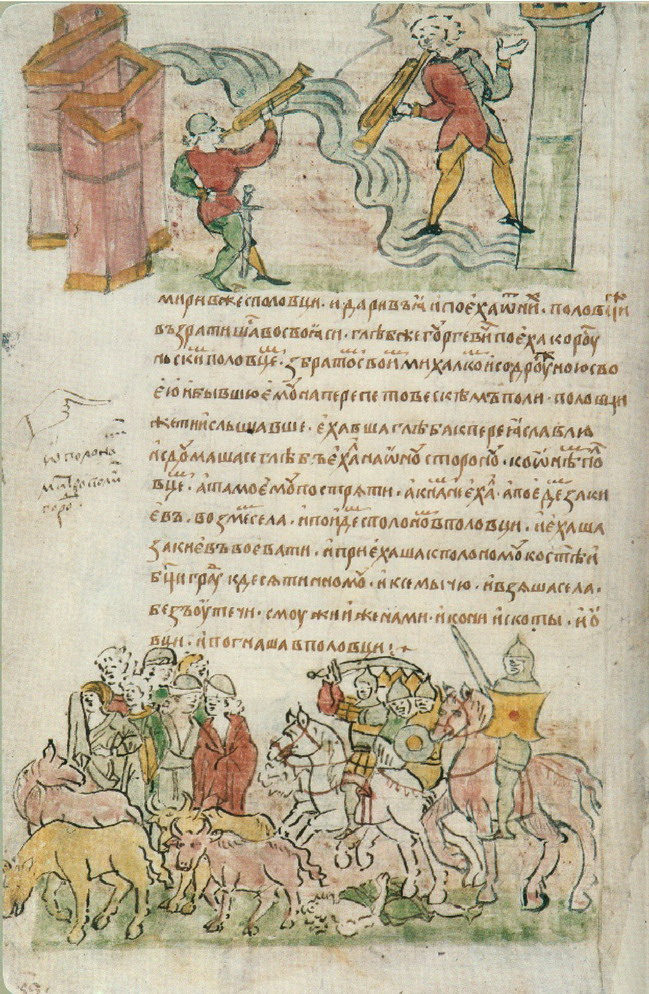
413

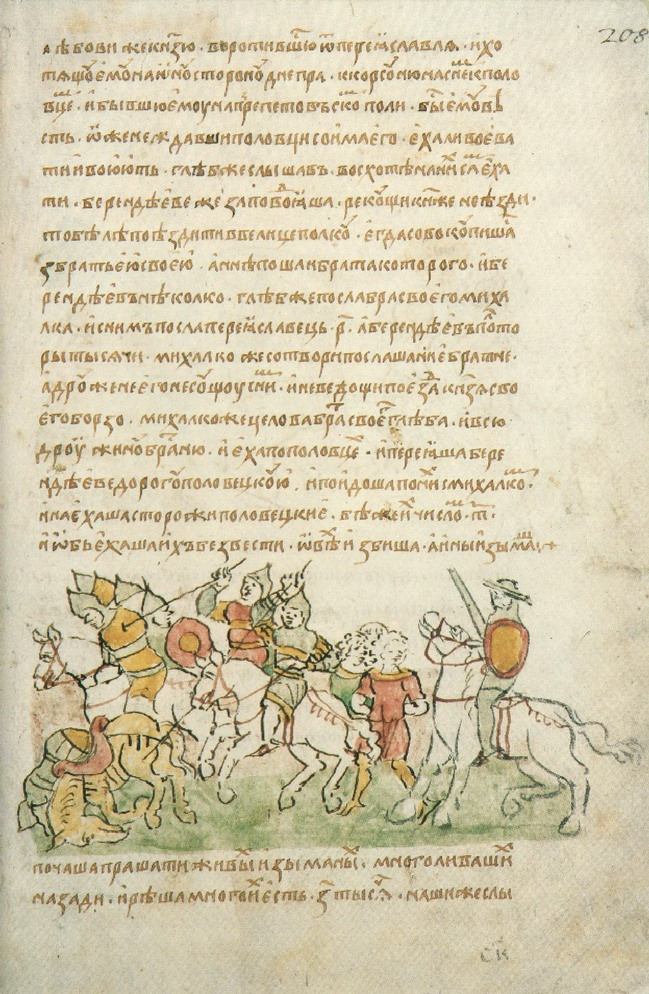
414

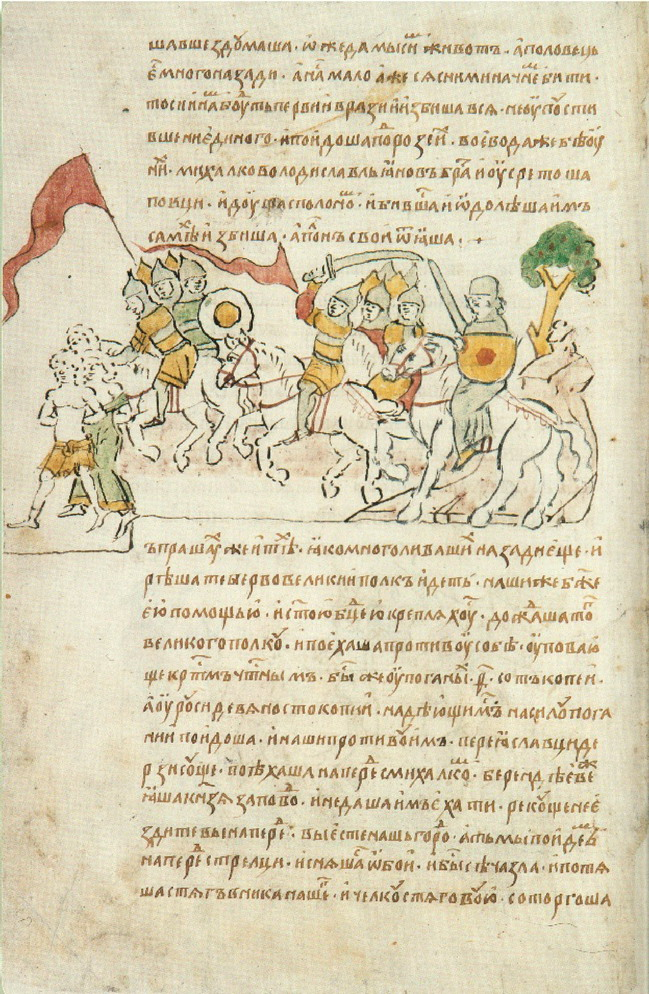
415

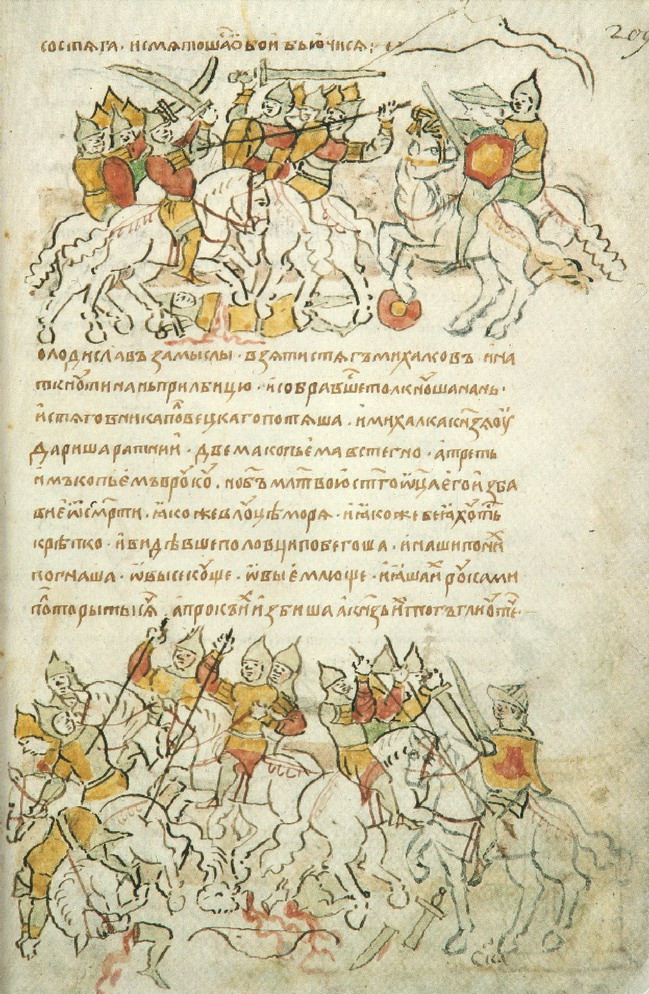
416

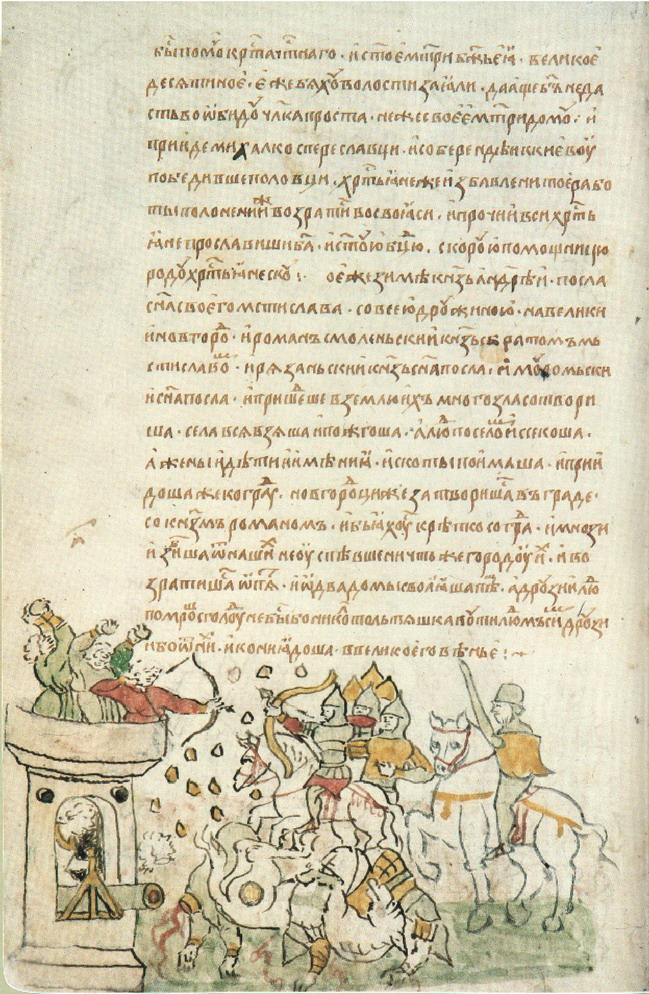
417

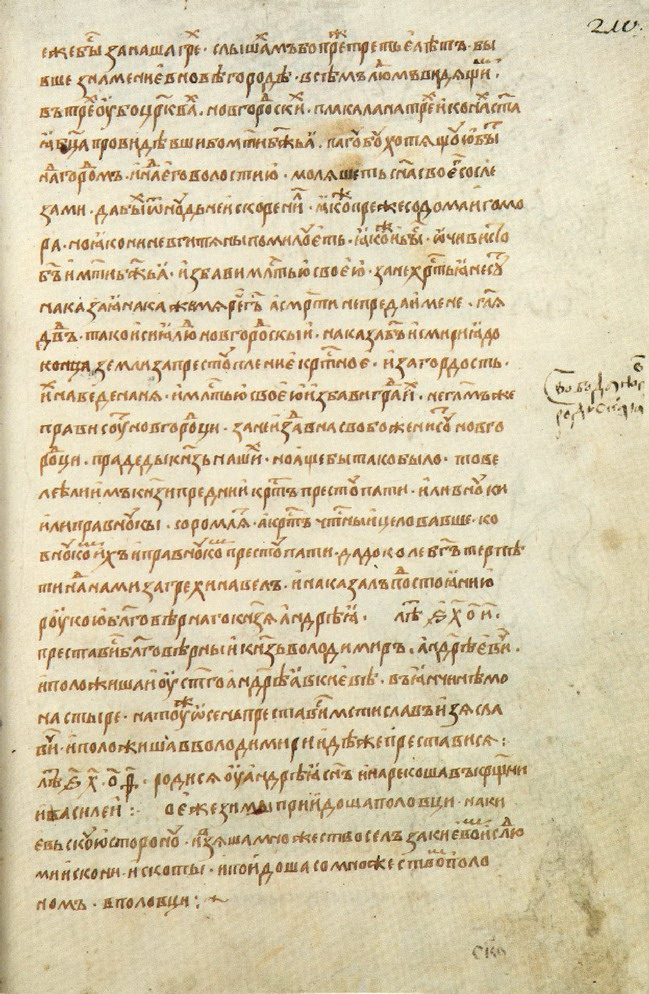
418

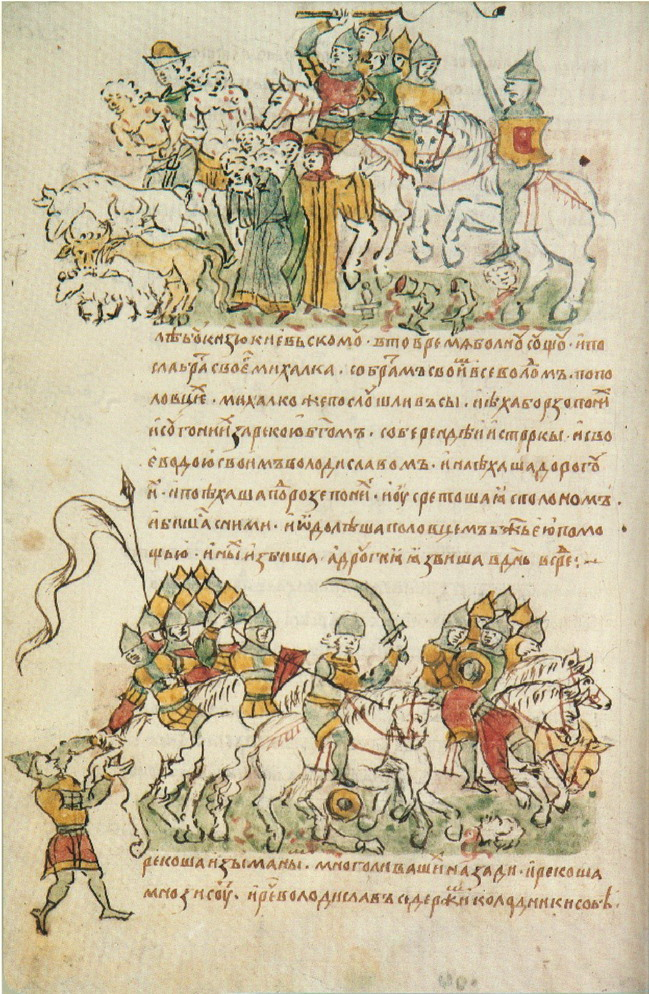
419

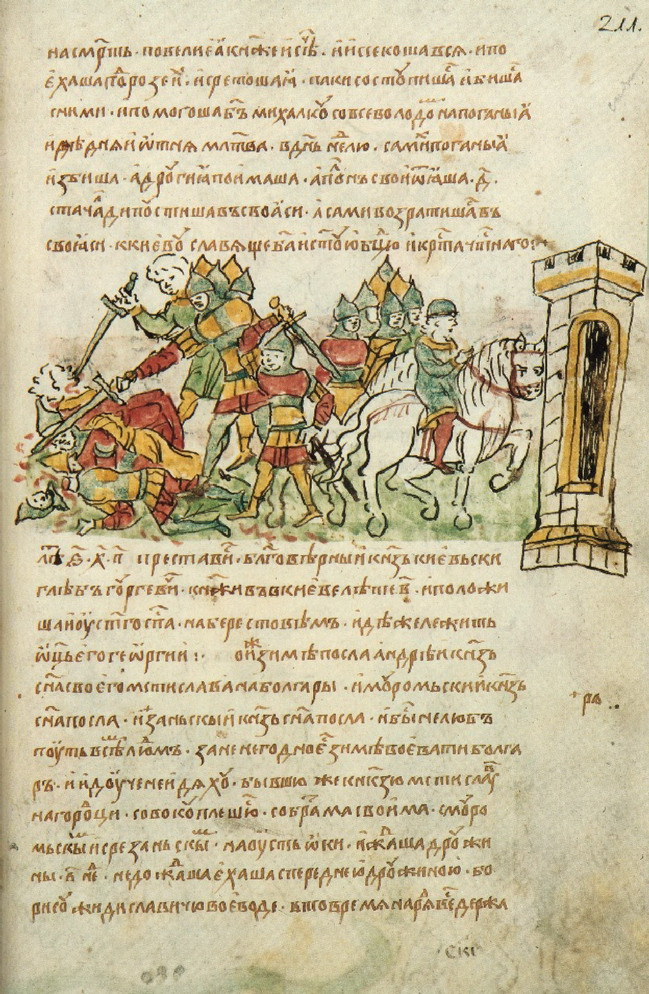
420

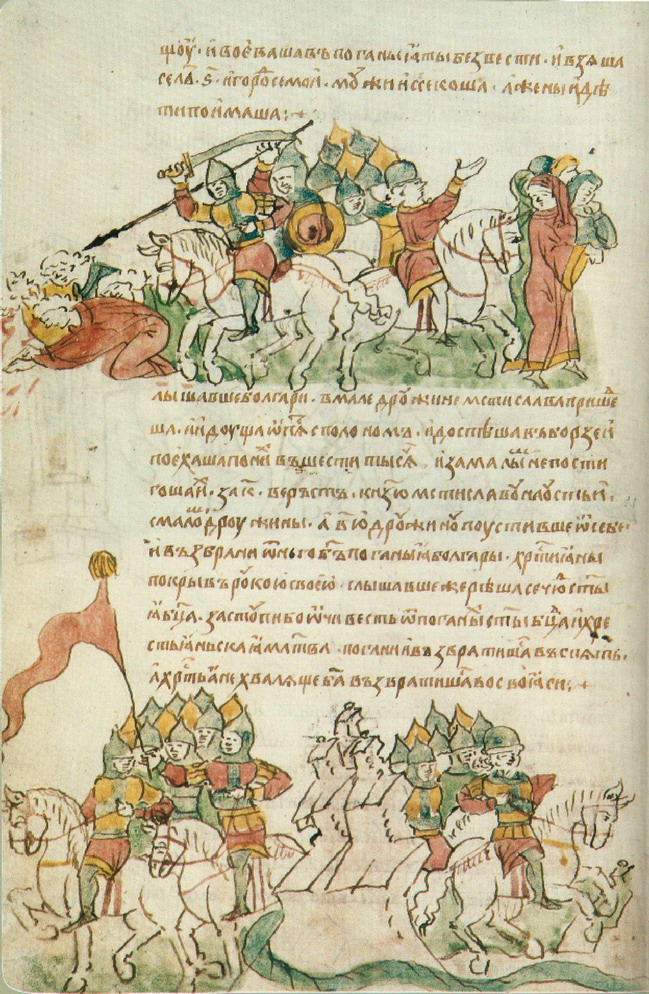
421

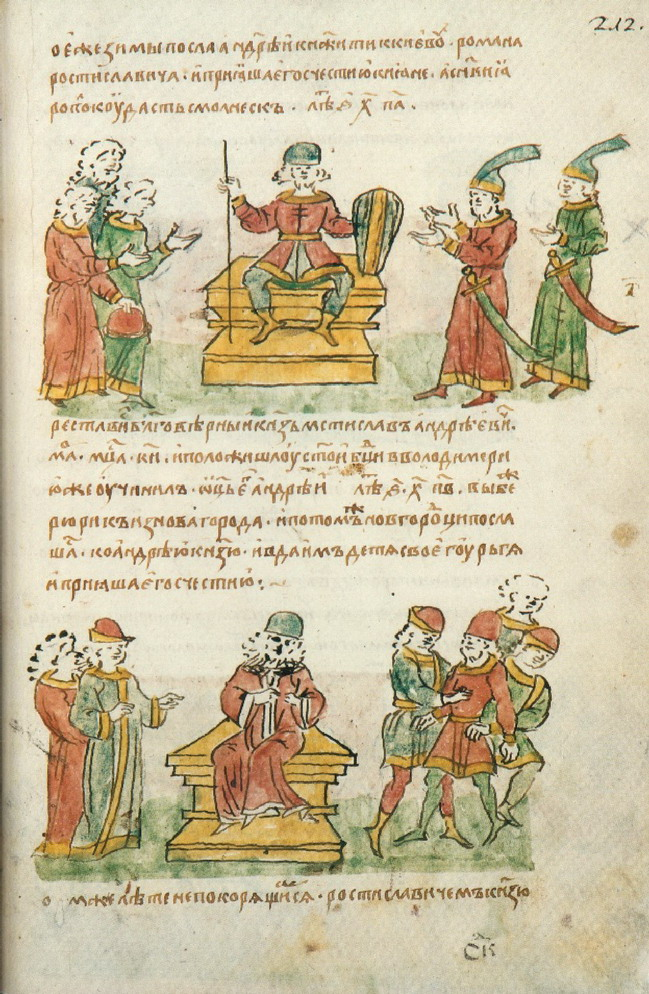
422

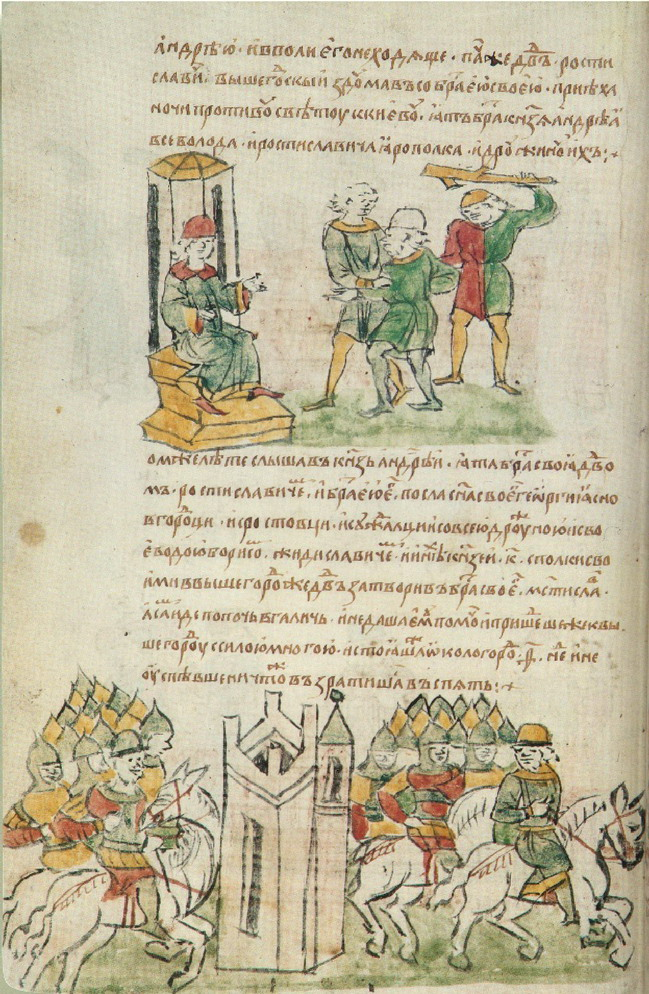
423

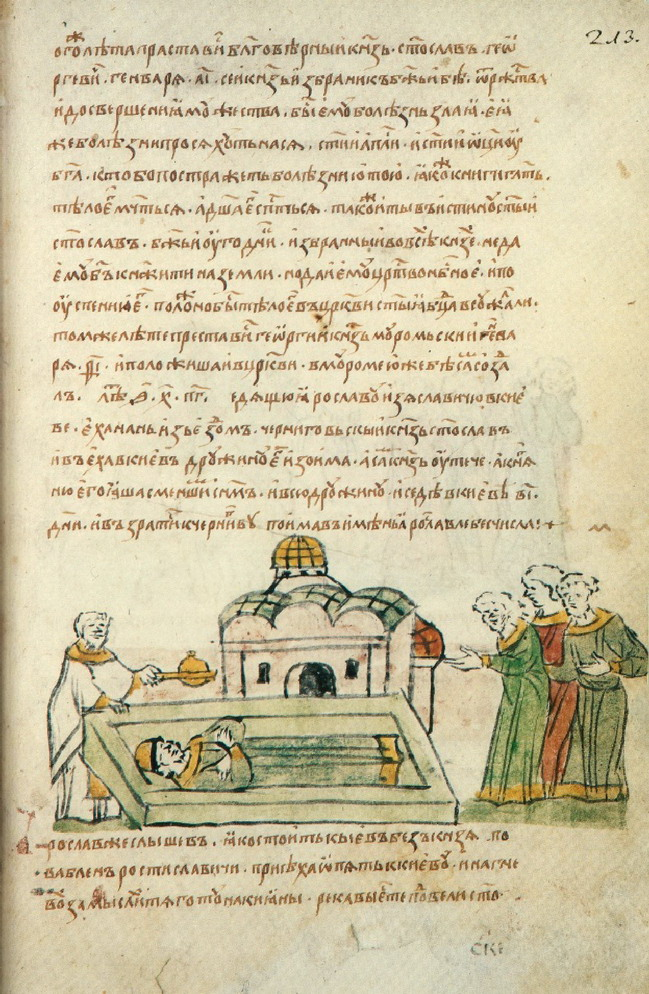
424

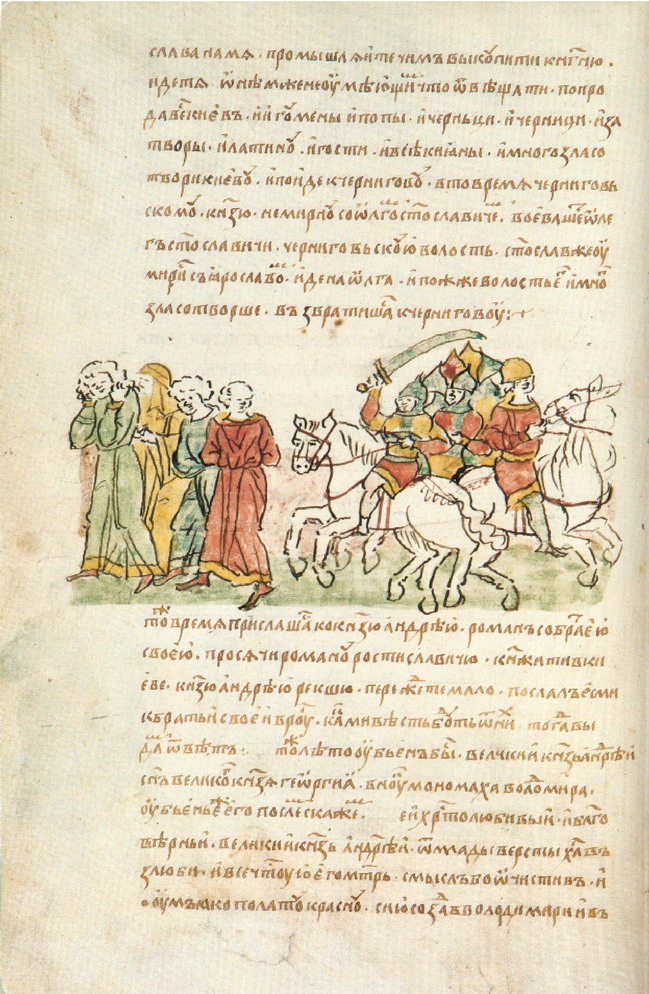
425

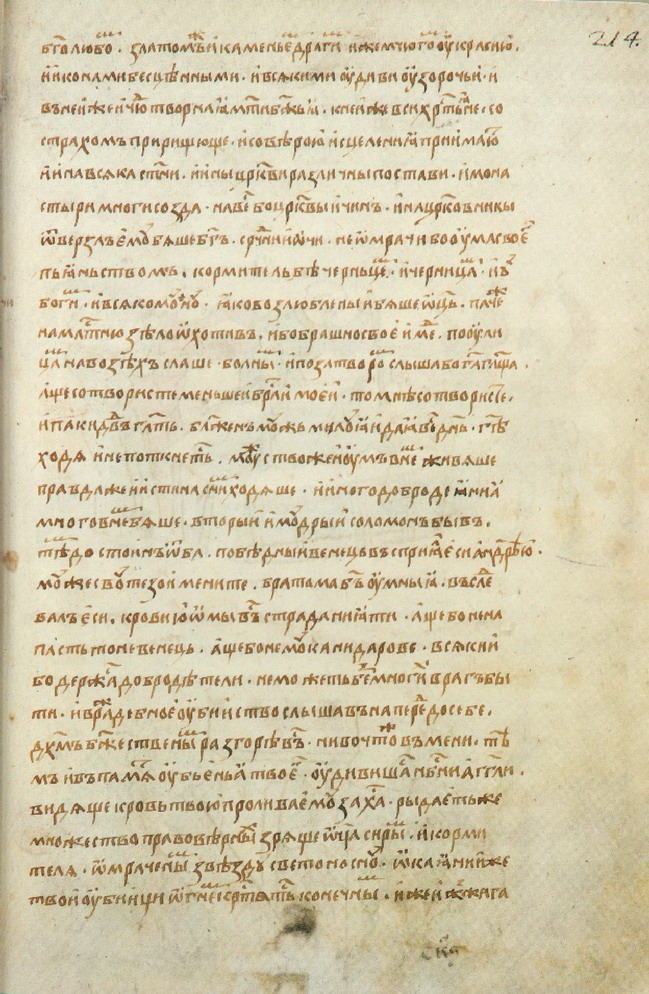
426

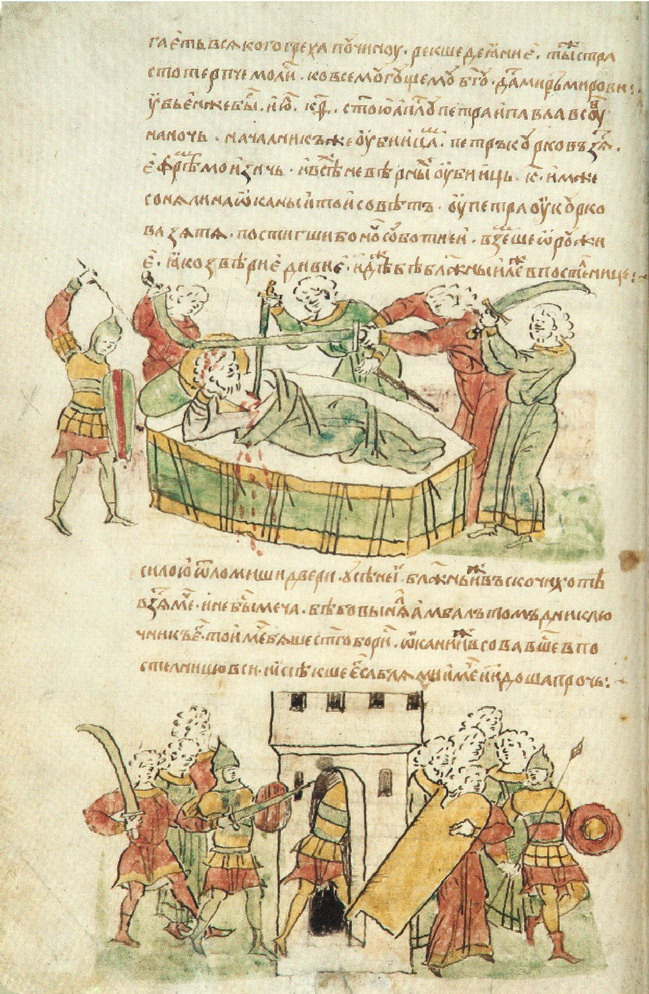
427

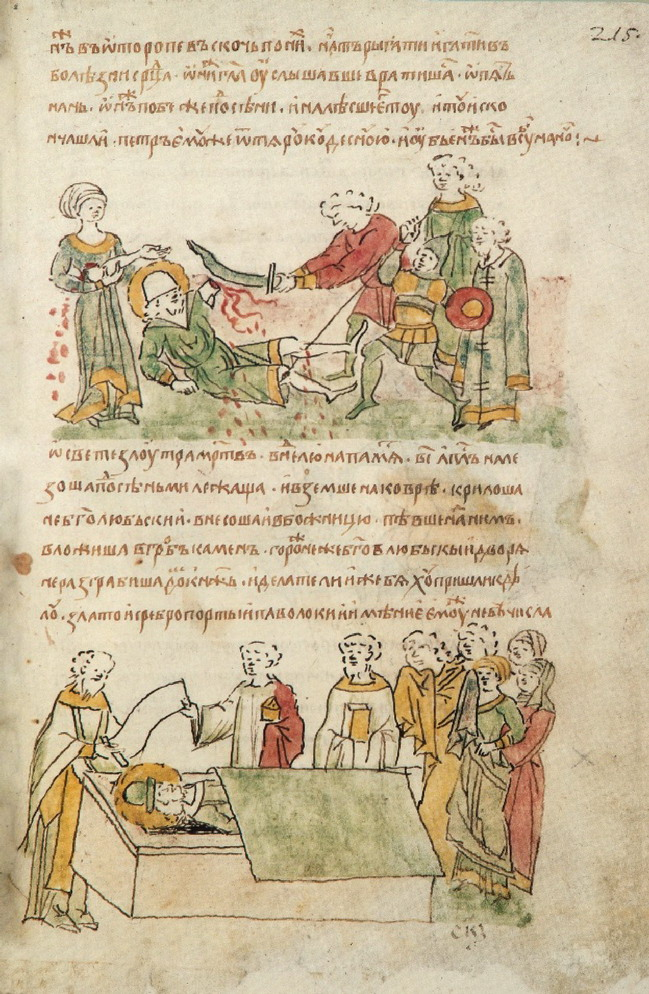
428

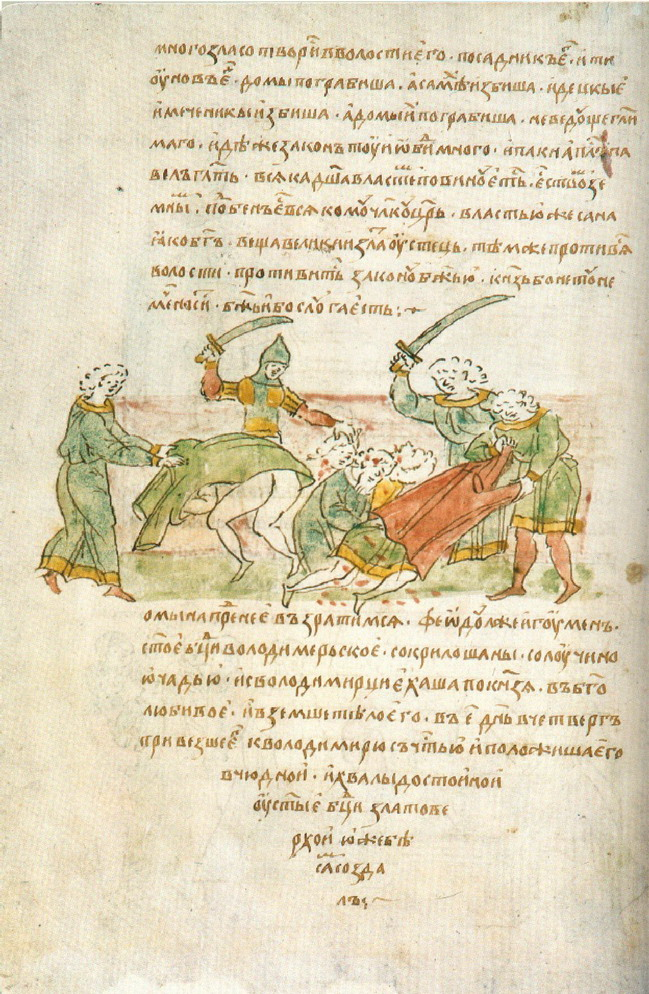
429

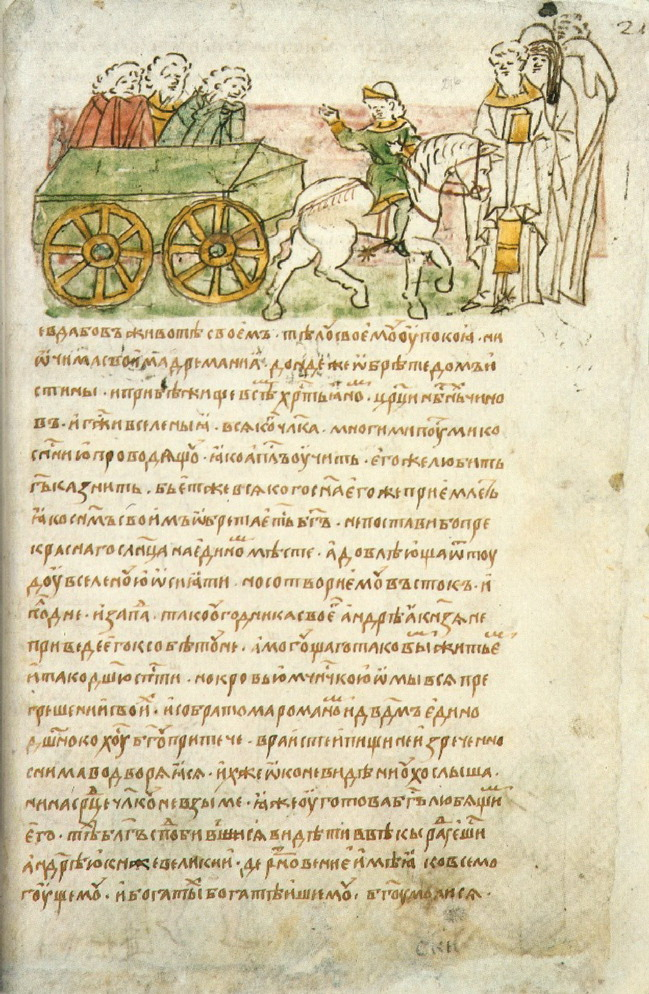
430

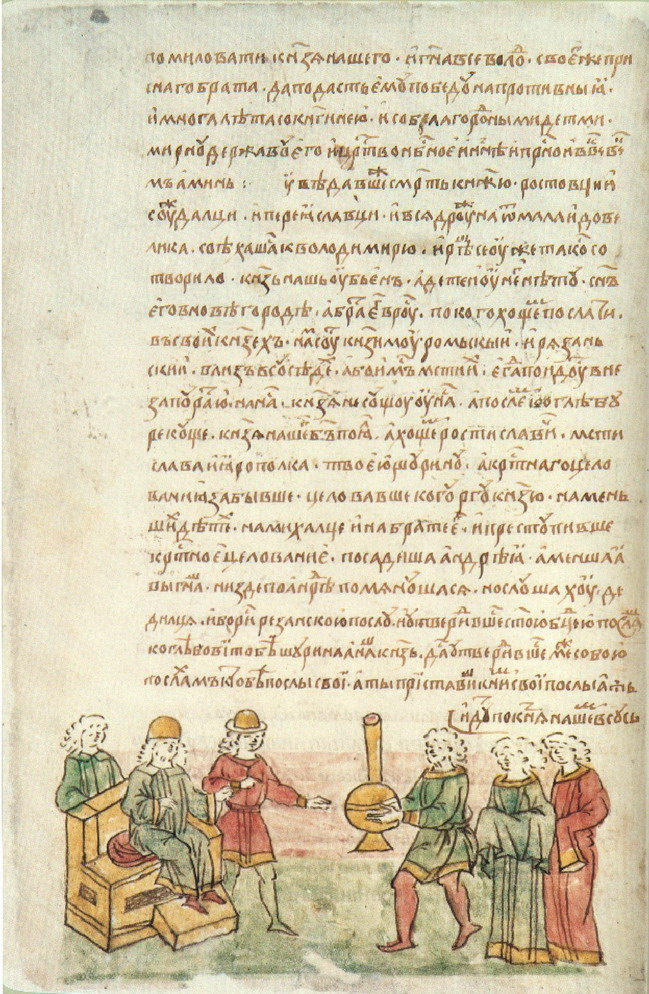
431

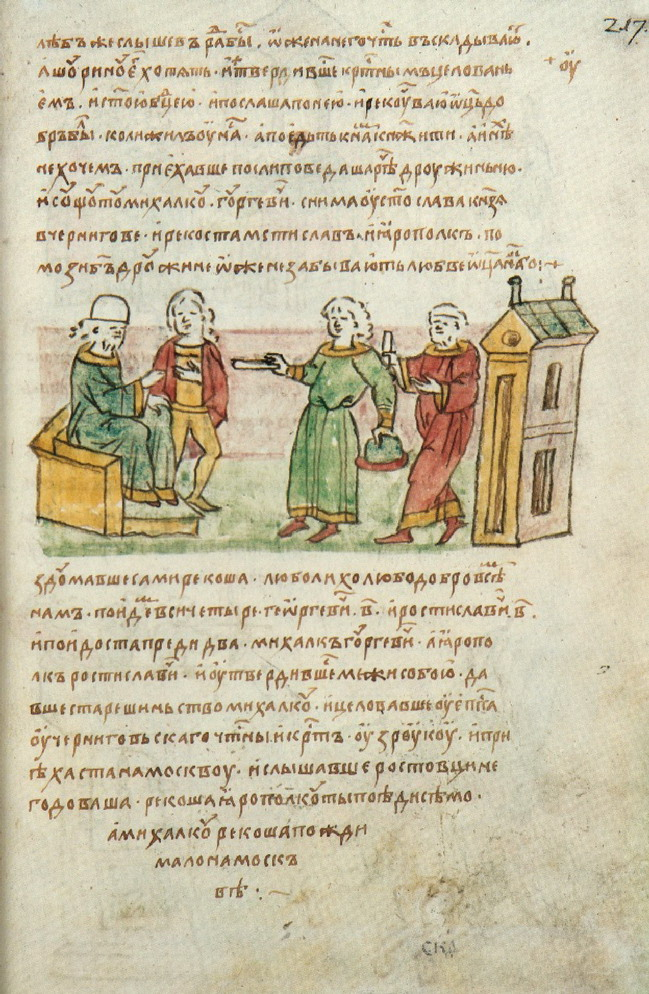
432

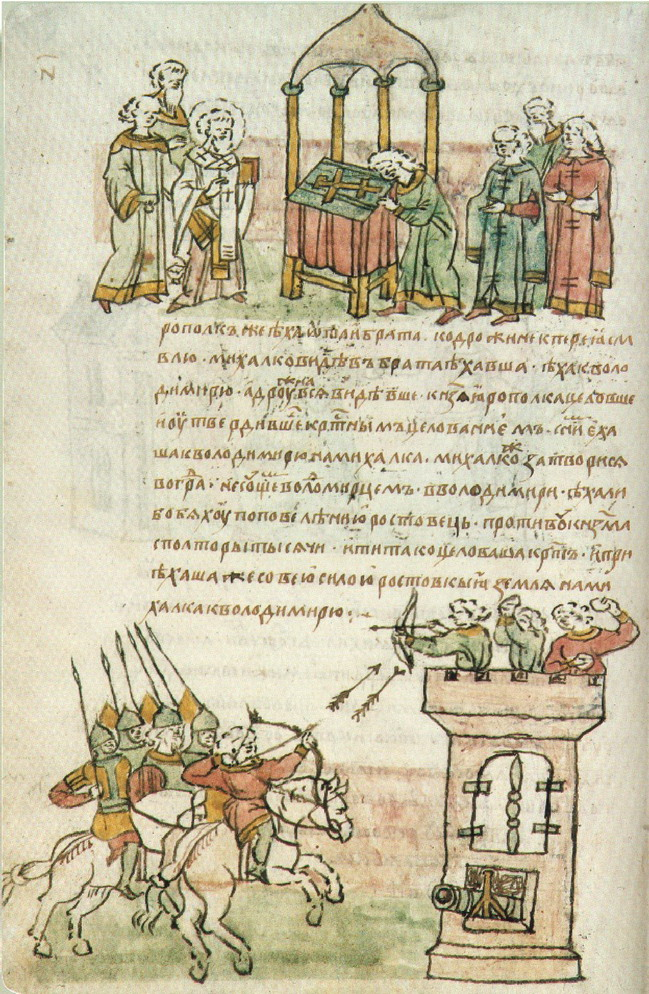
433

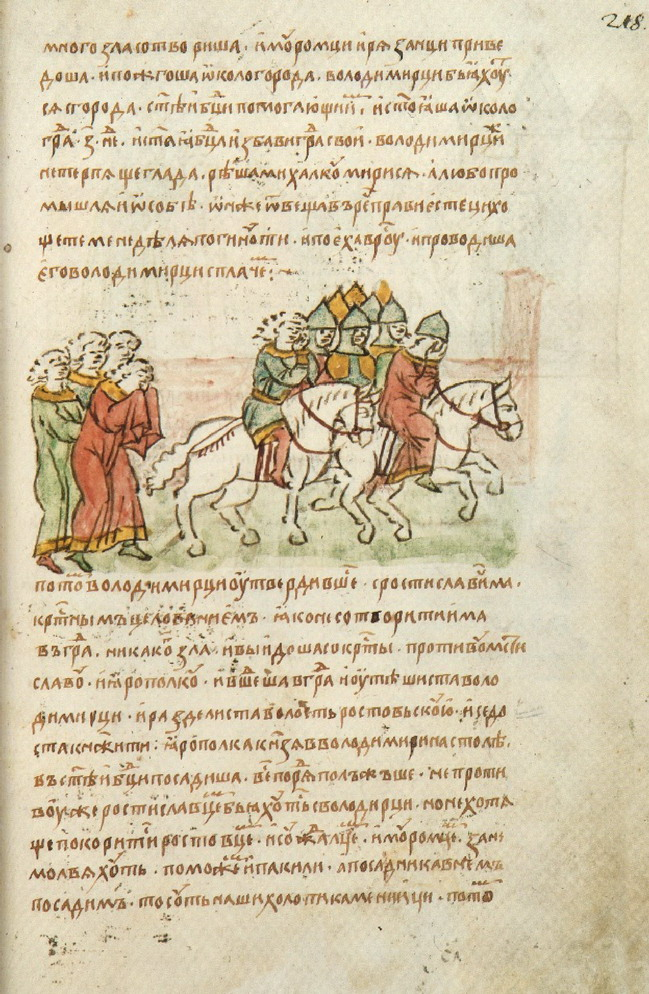
434

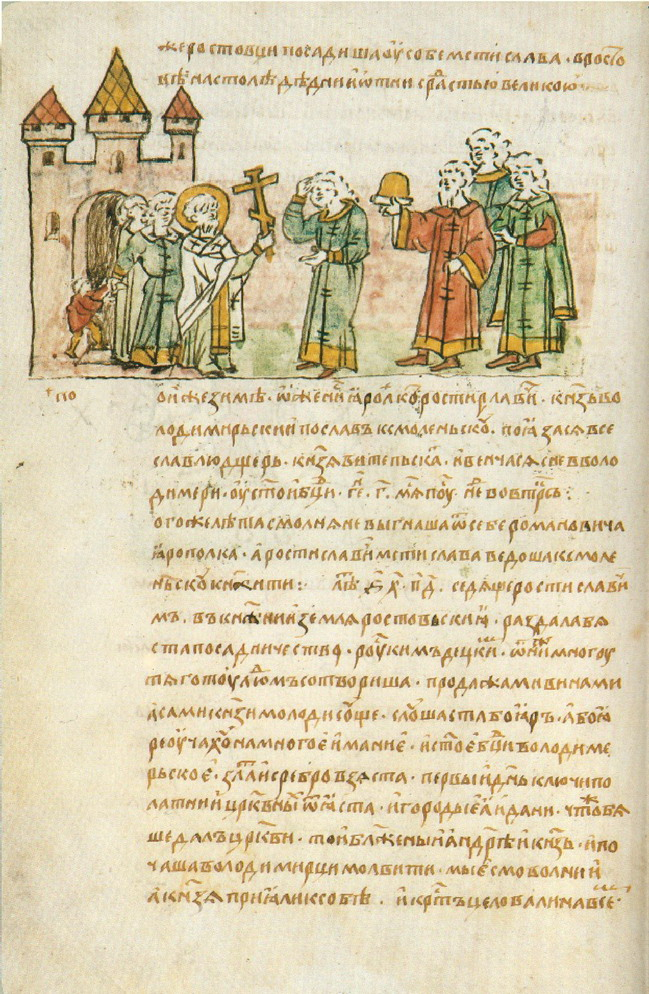
435

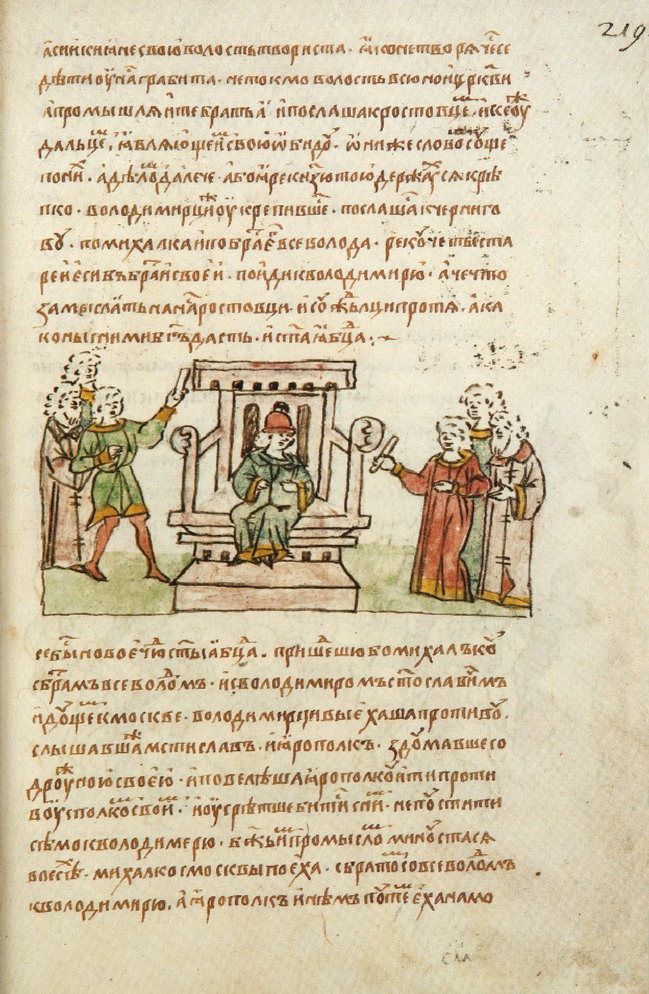
436

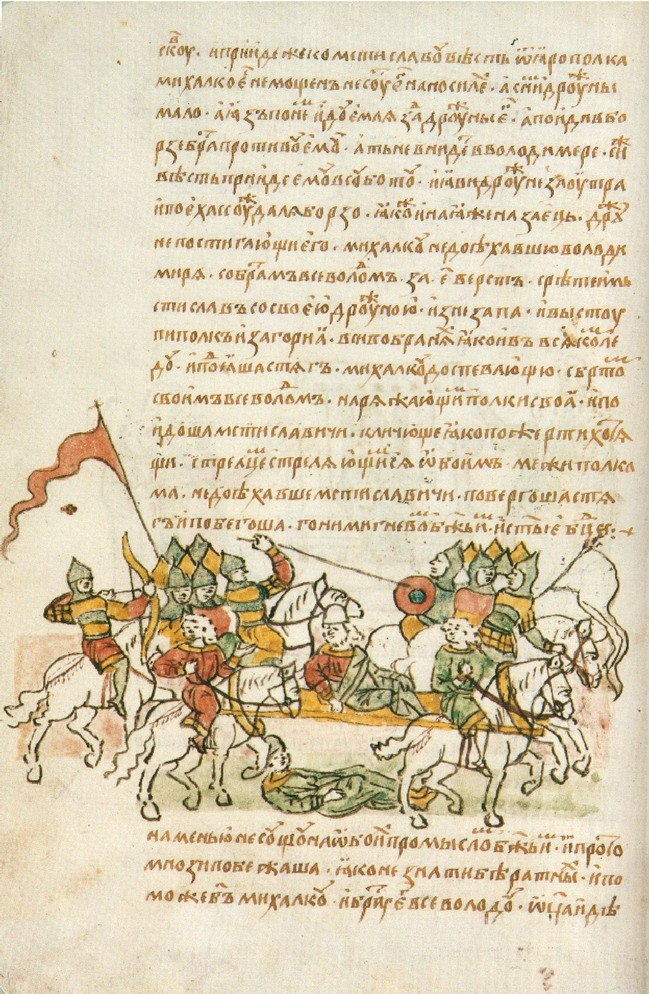
437

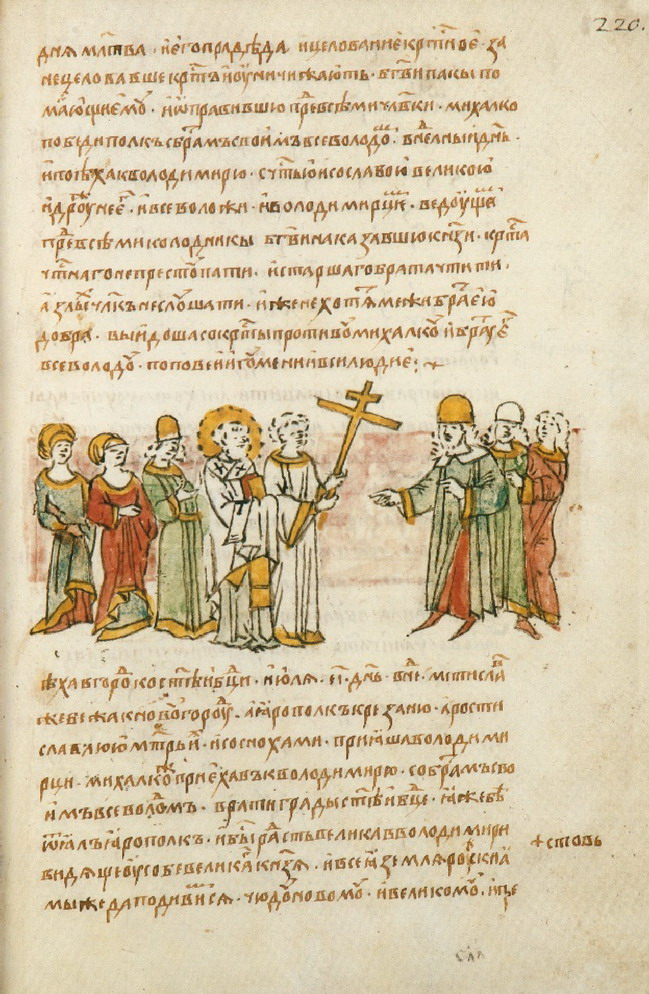
438

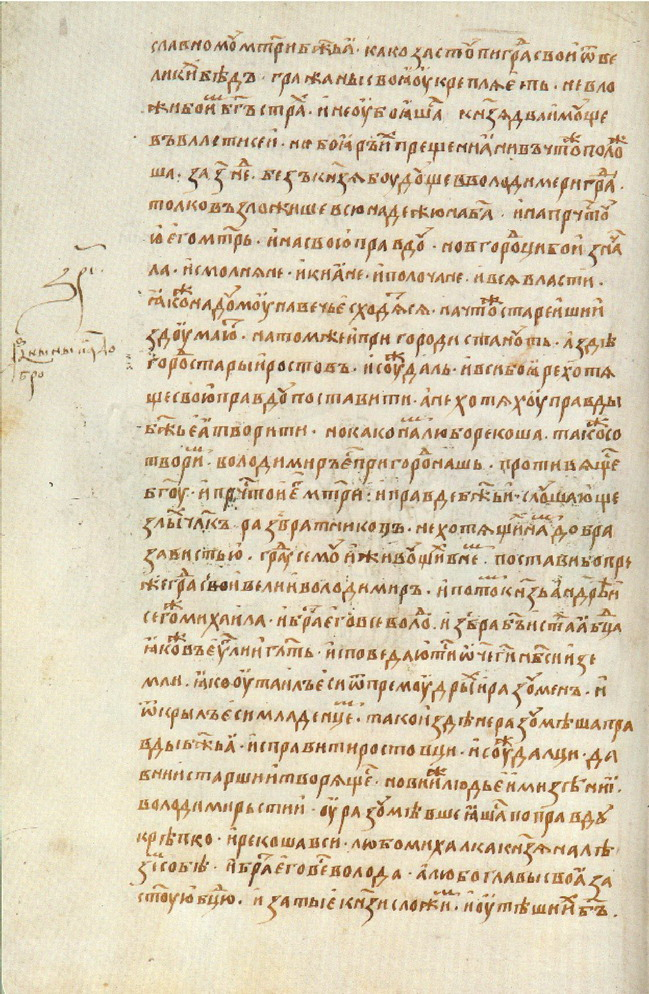
439

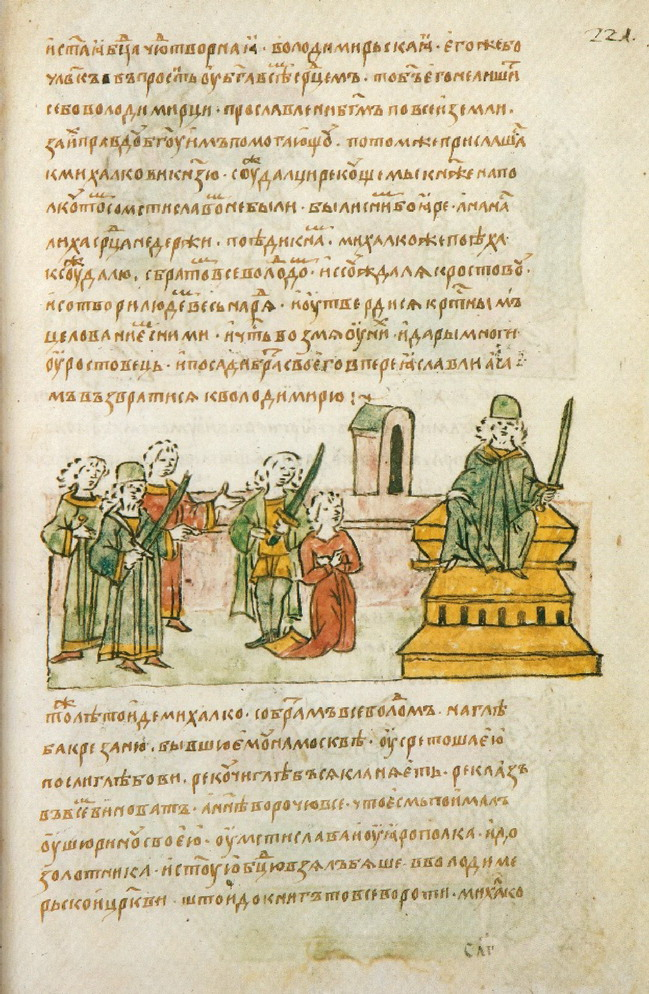
440

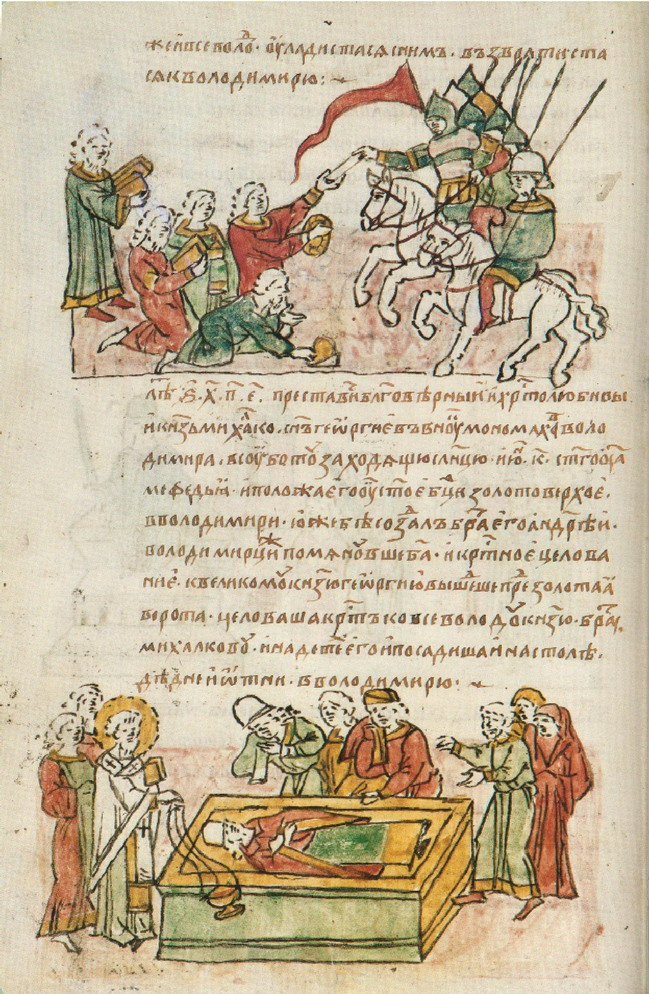
441

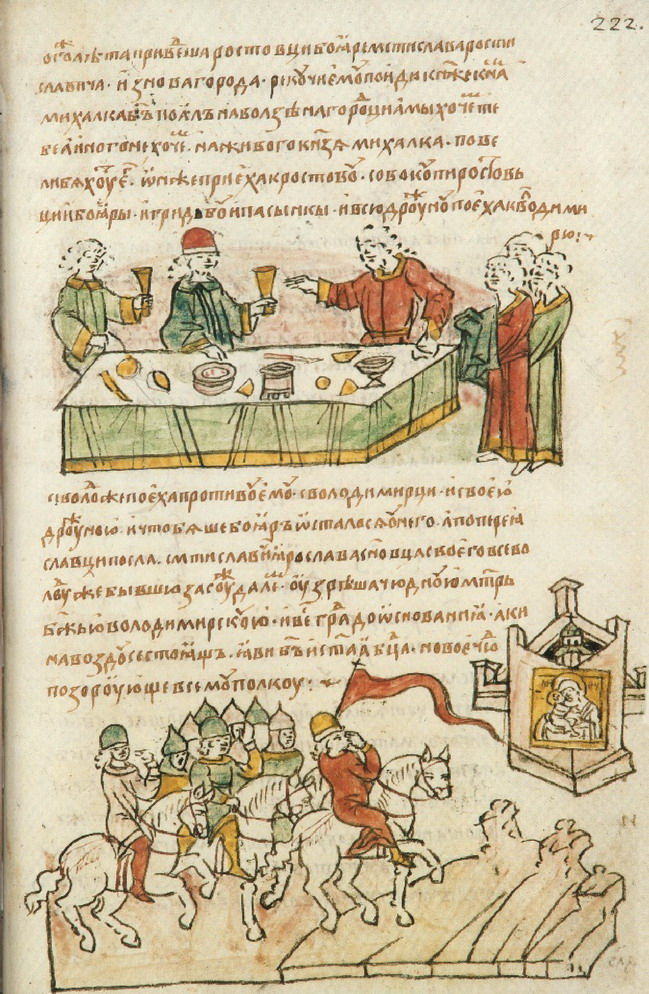
442

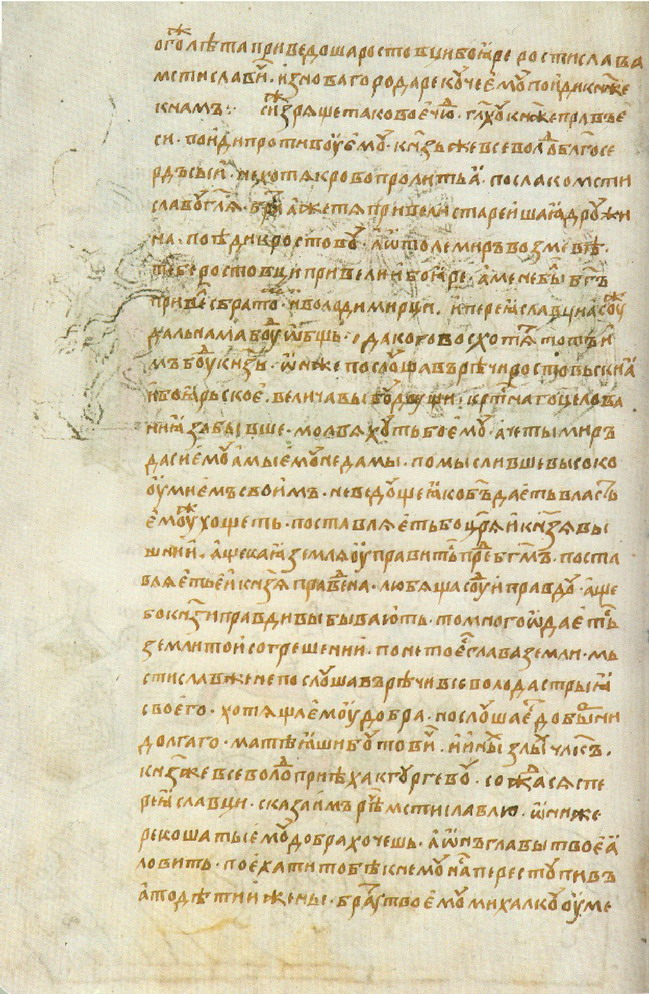
443

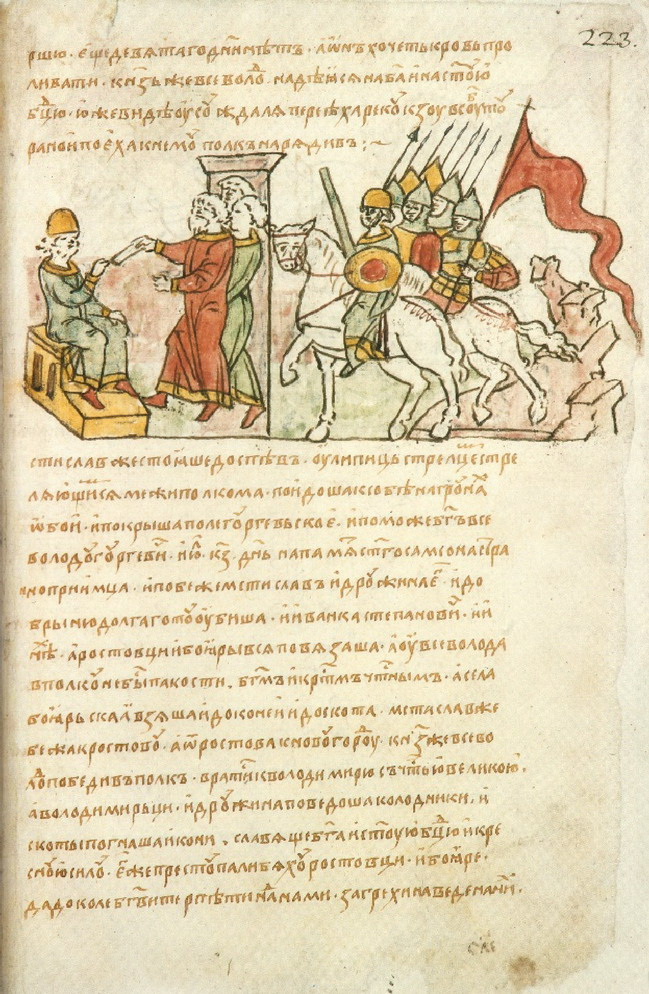
444

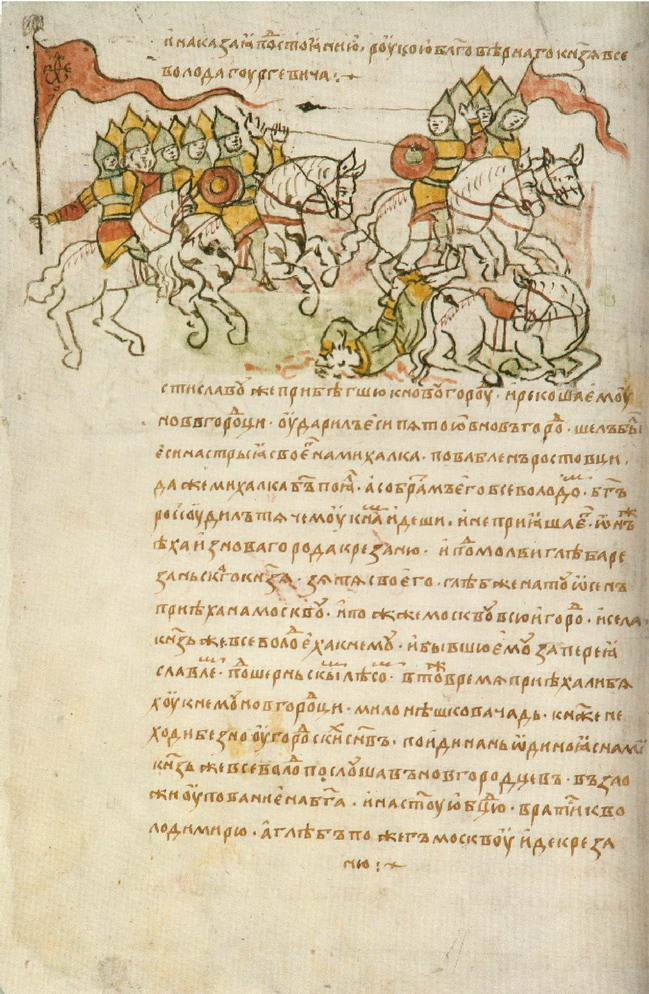
445

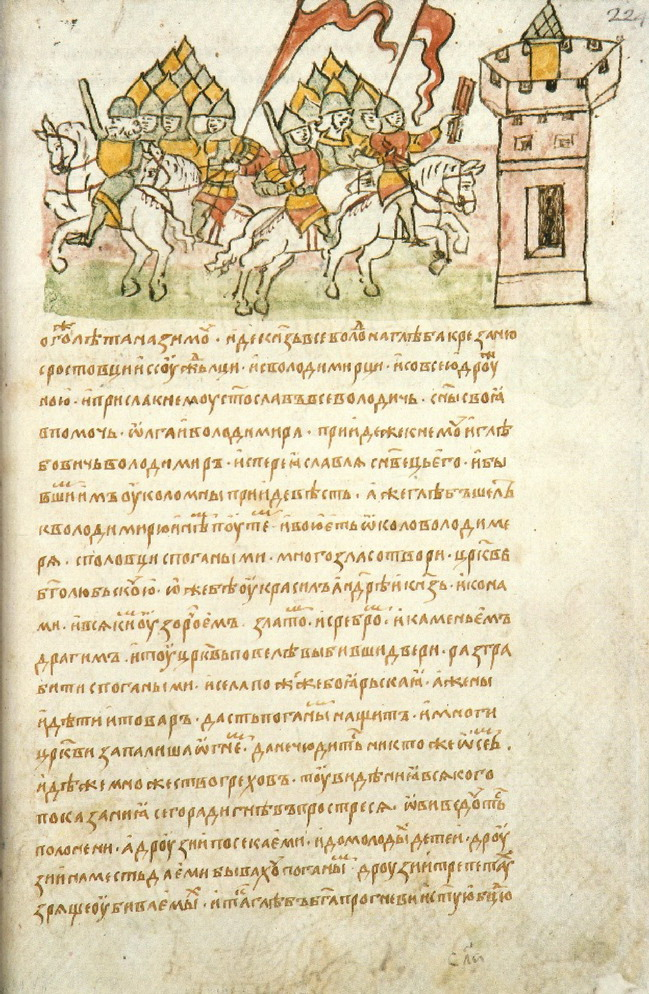
446

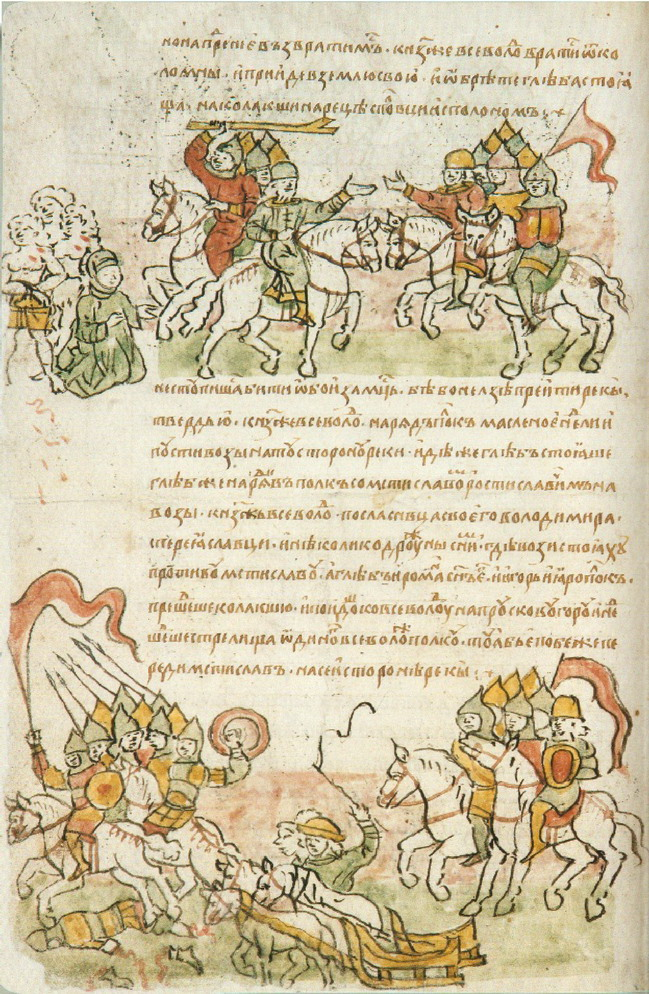
447

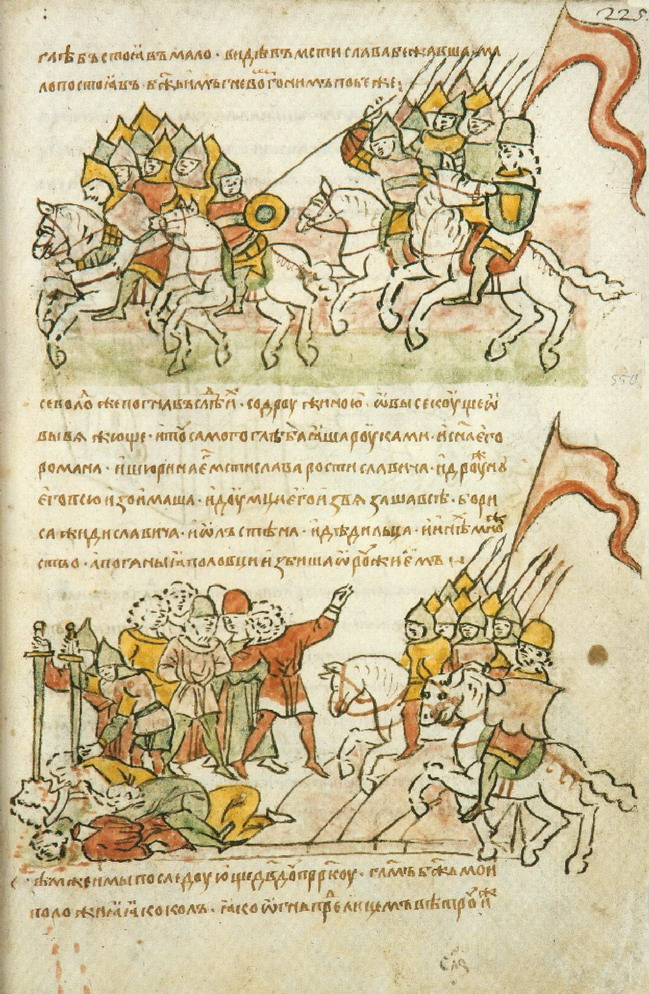
448

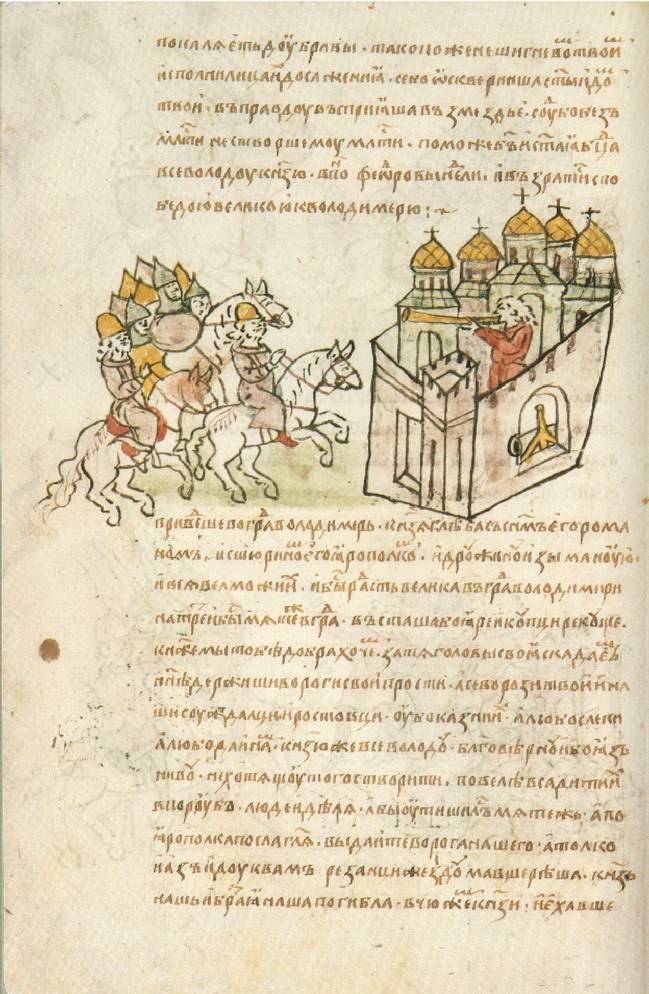
449

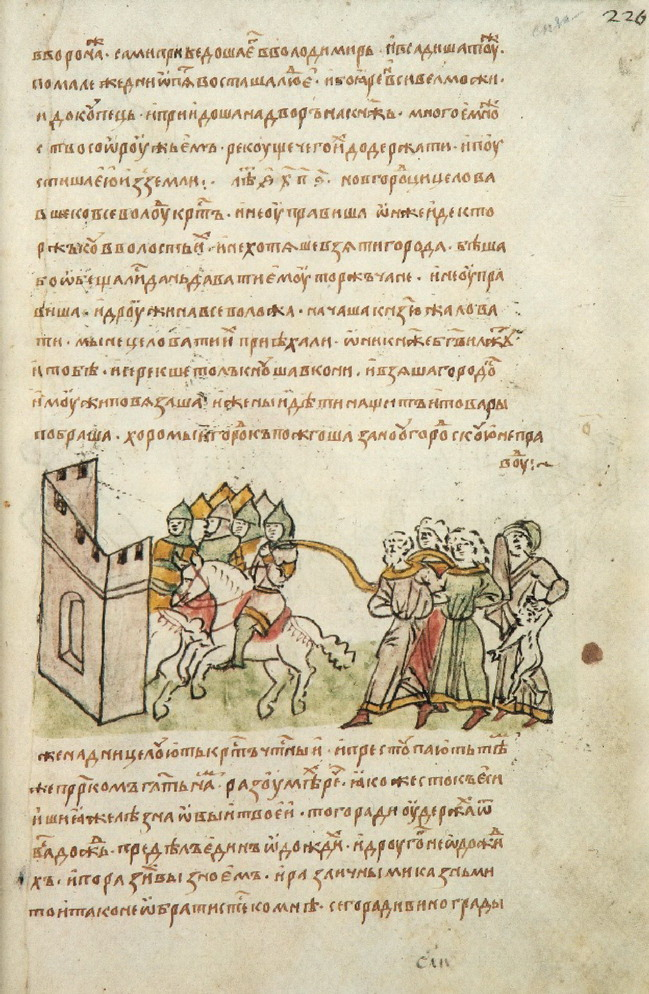
450

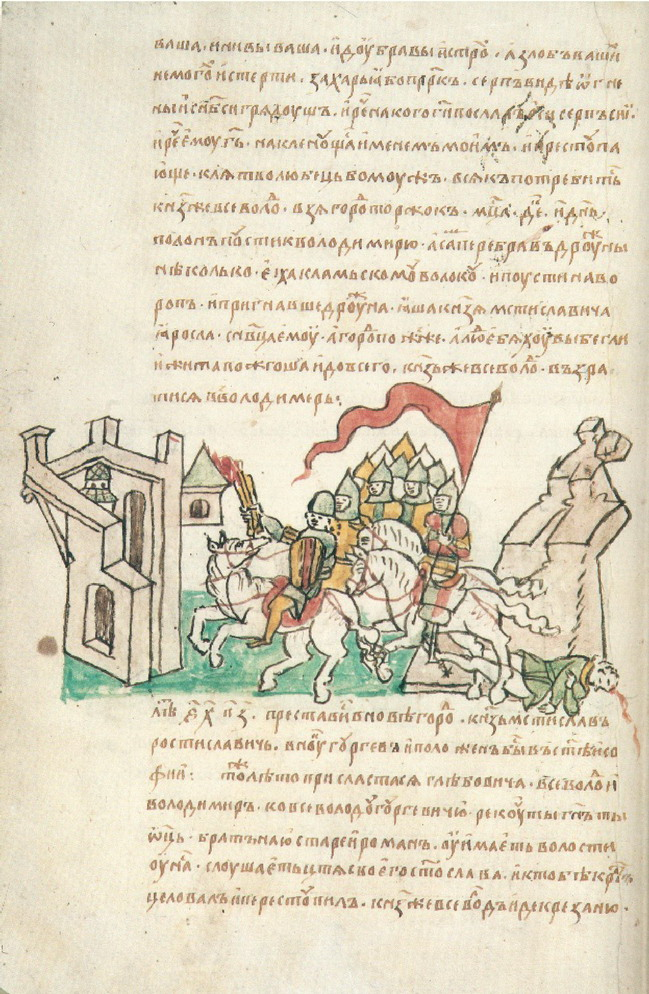
451

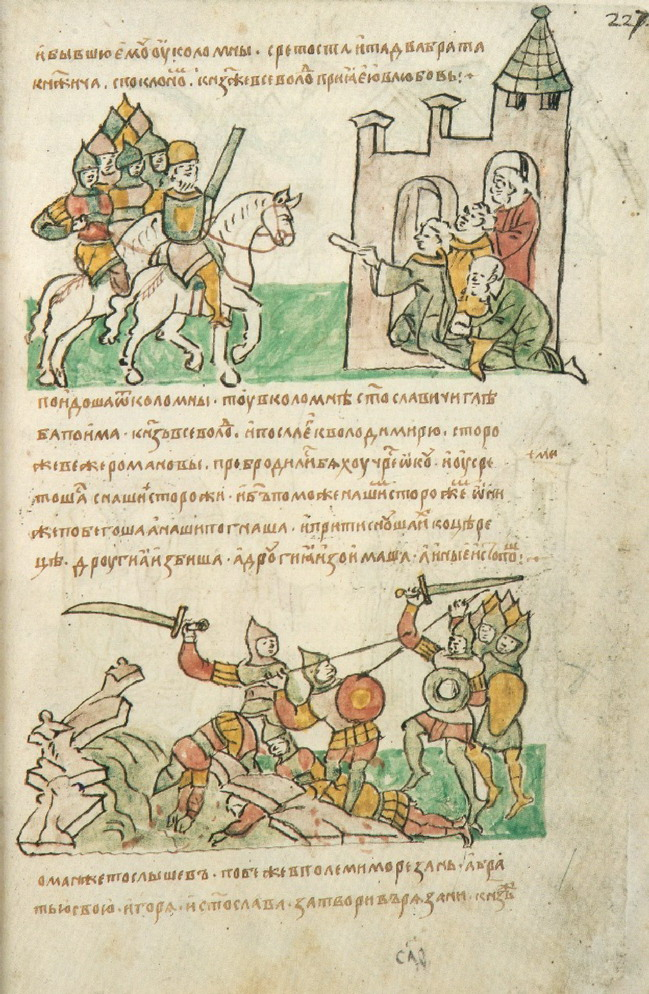
452

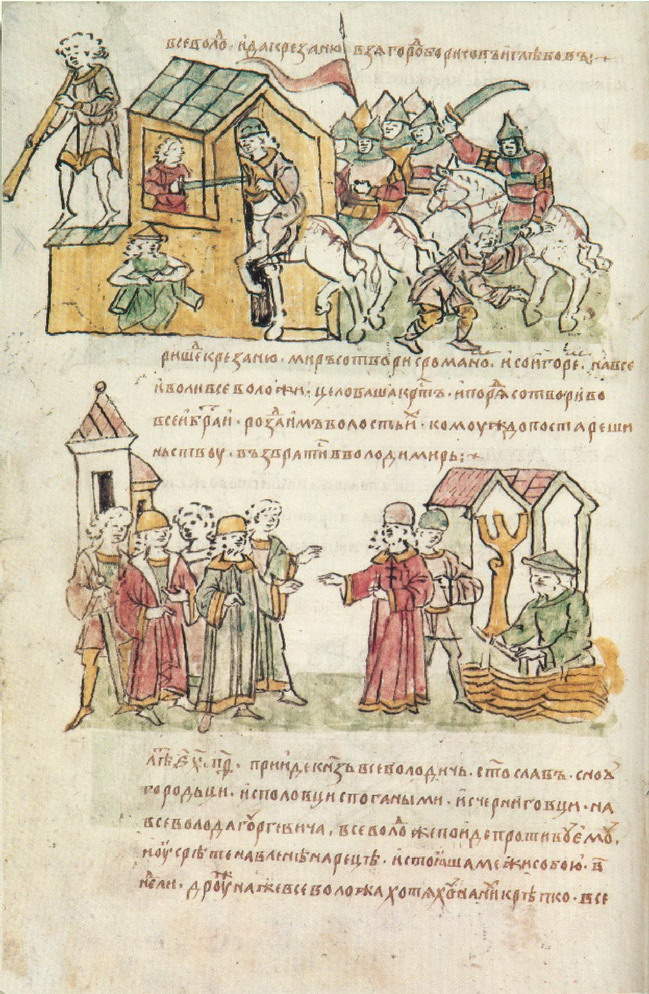
453

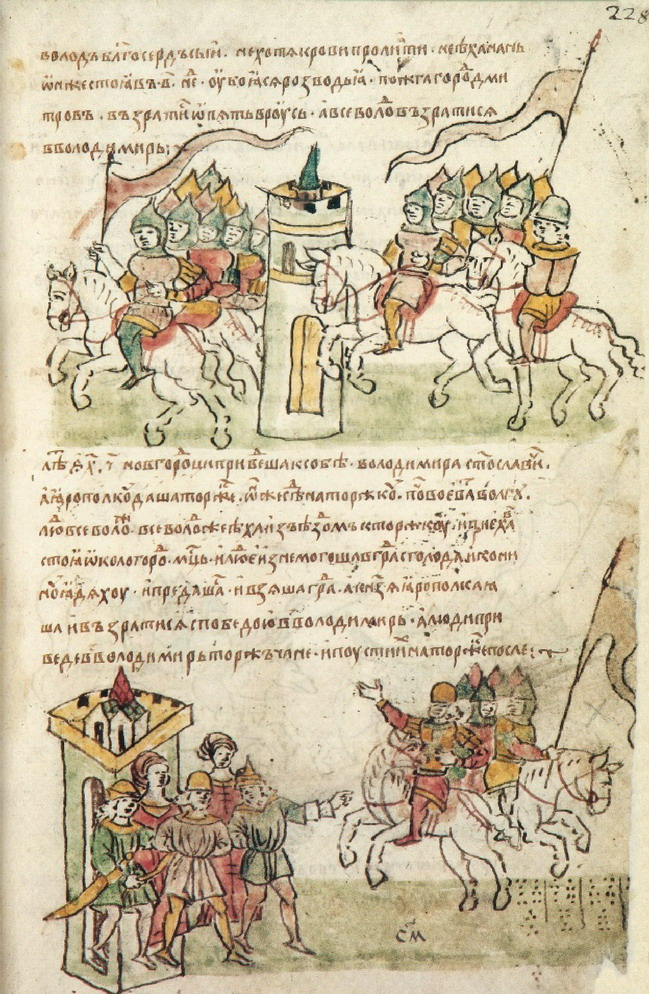
454

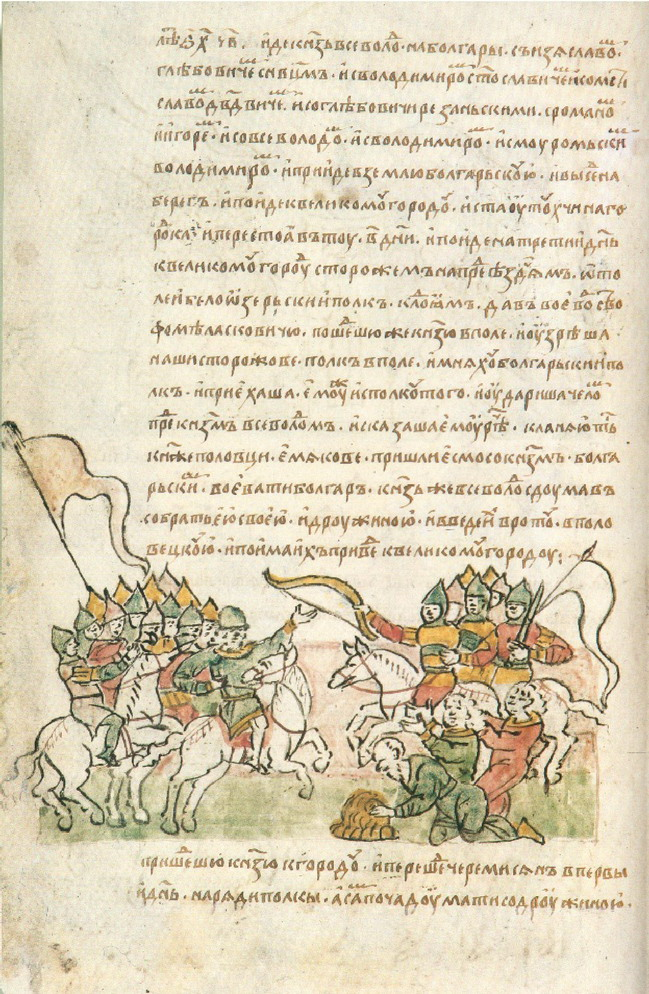
455

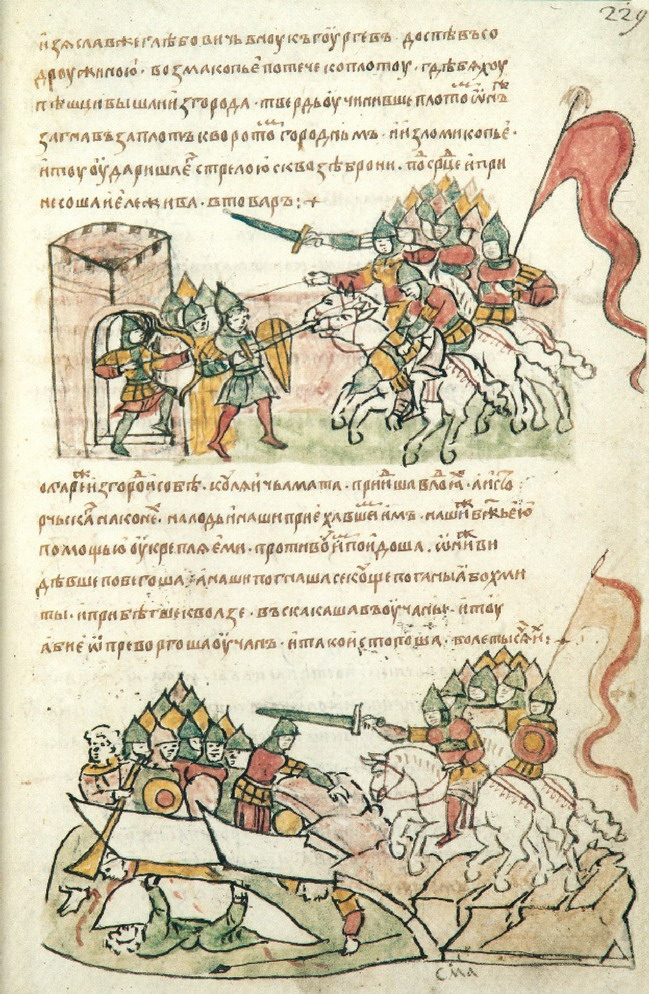
456

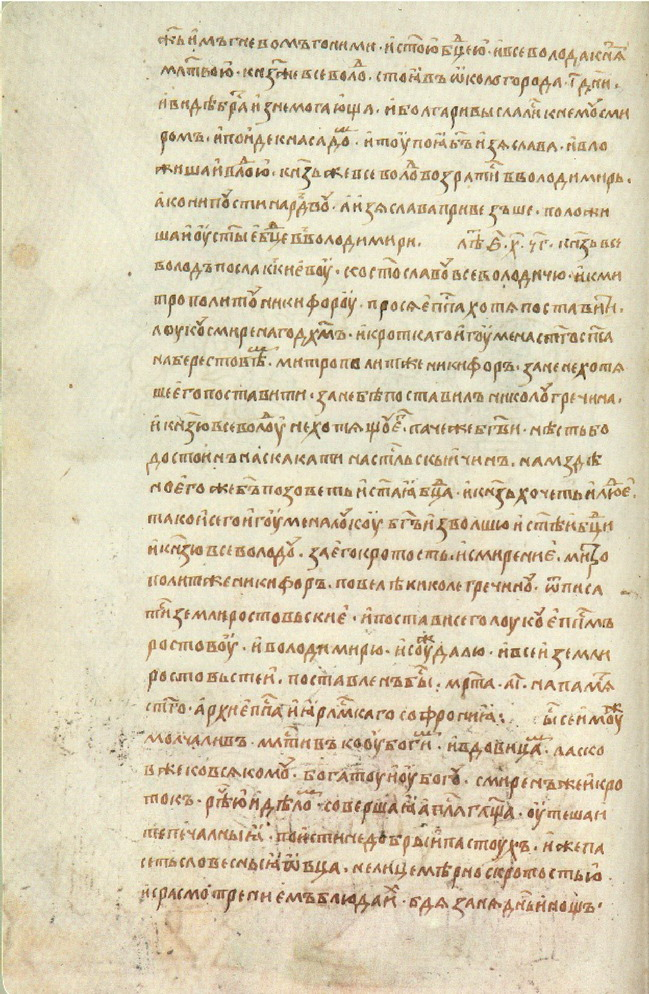
457

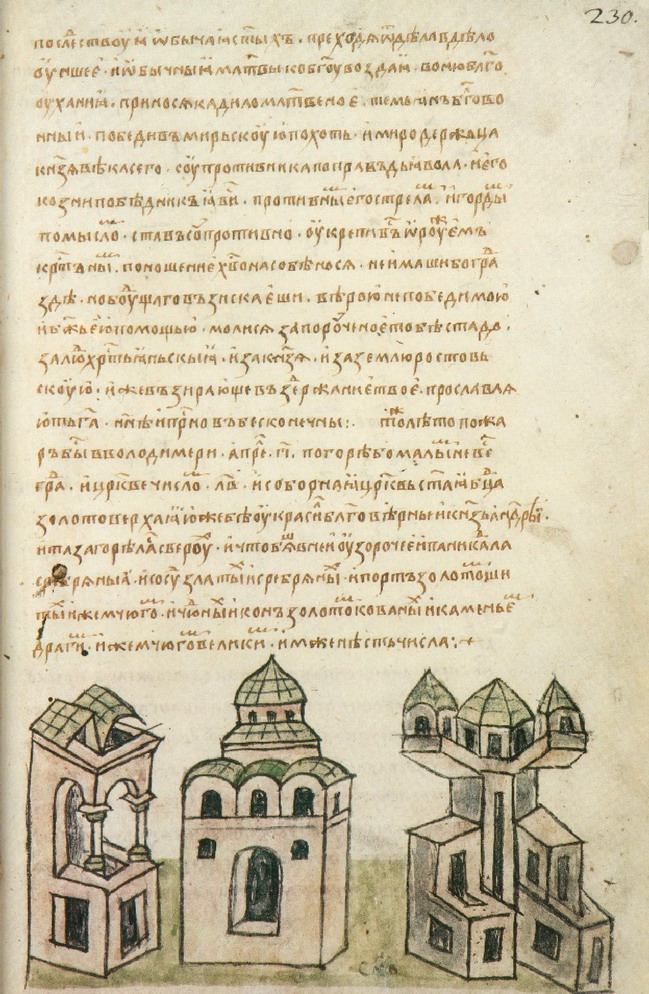
458

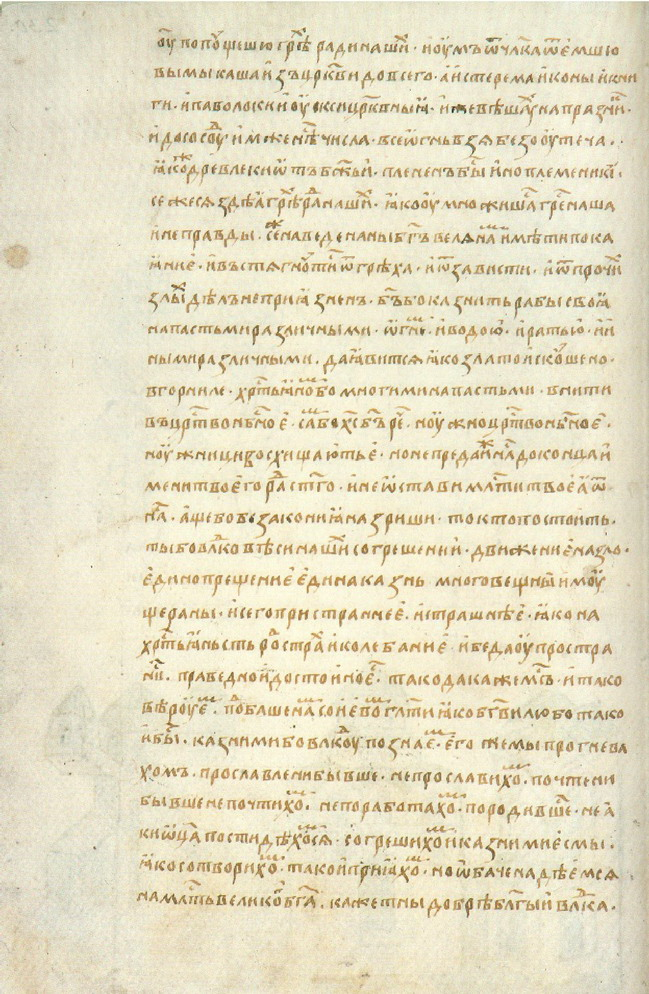
459

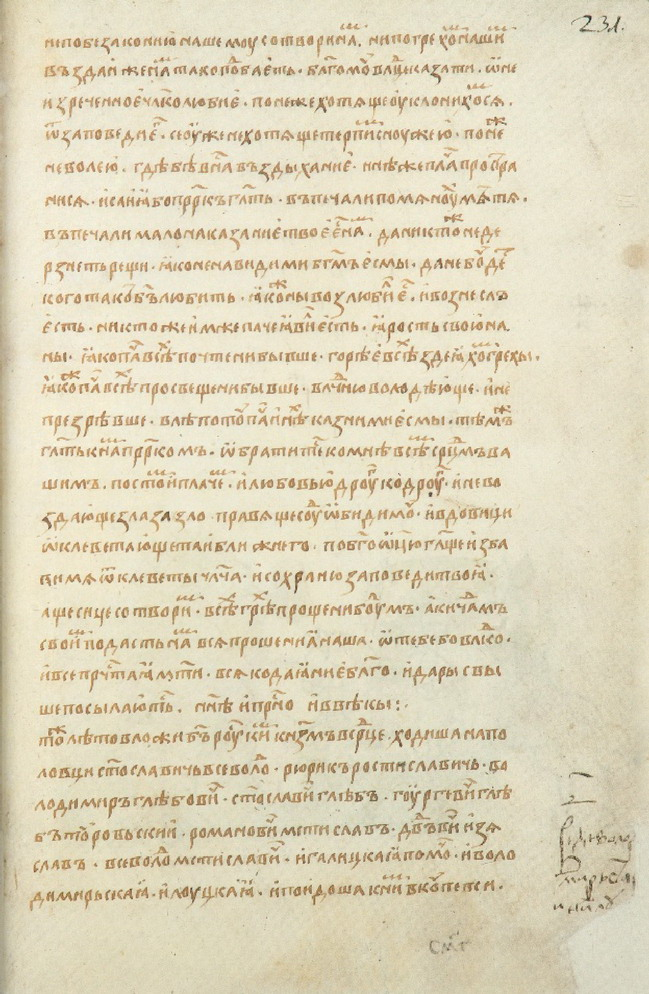
460

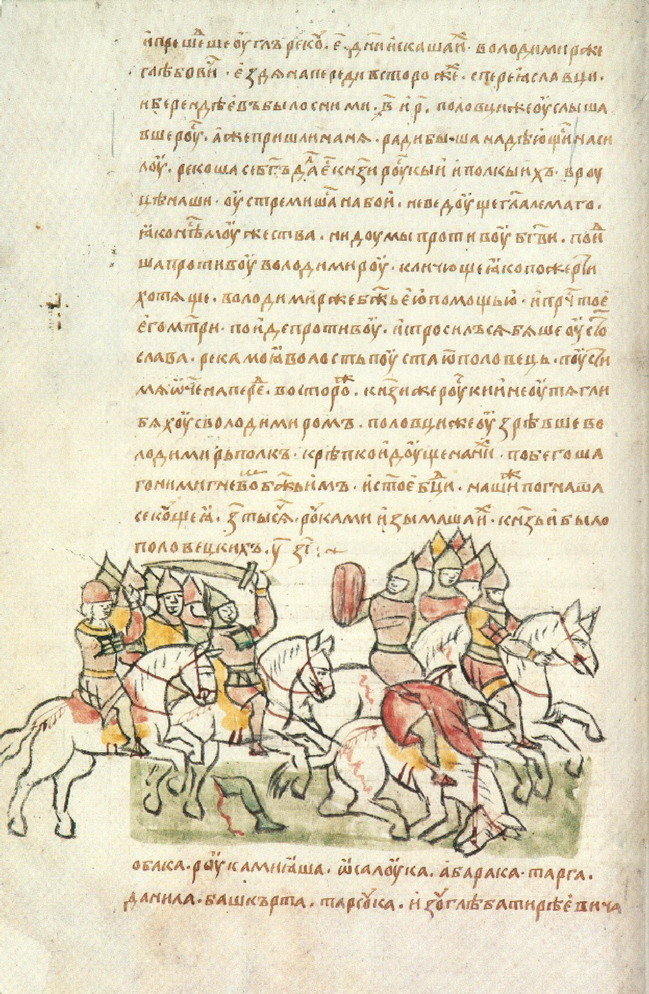
461

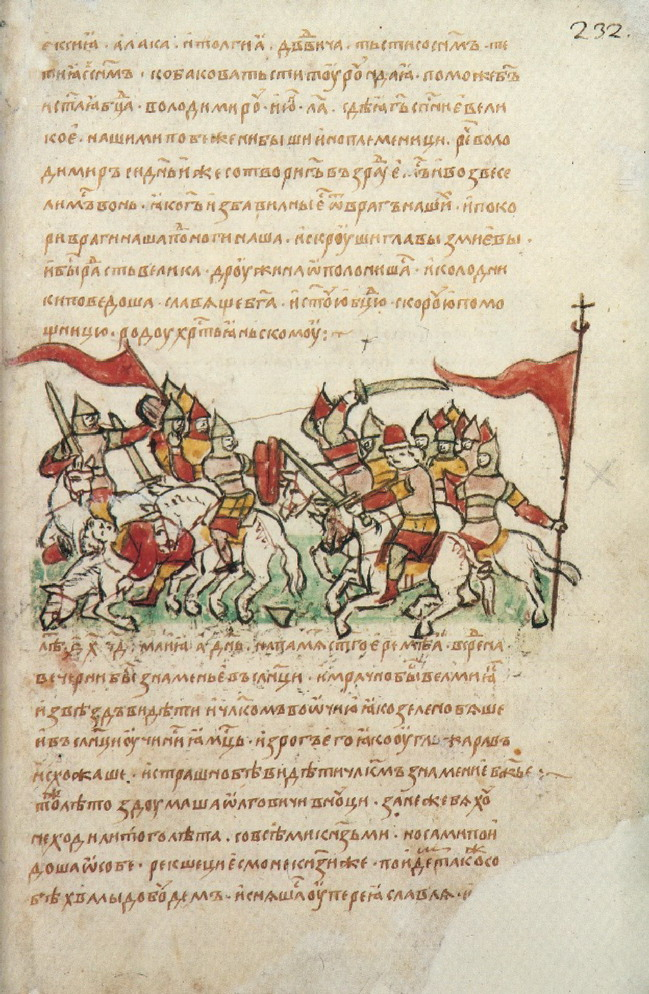
462

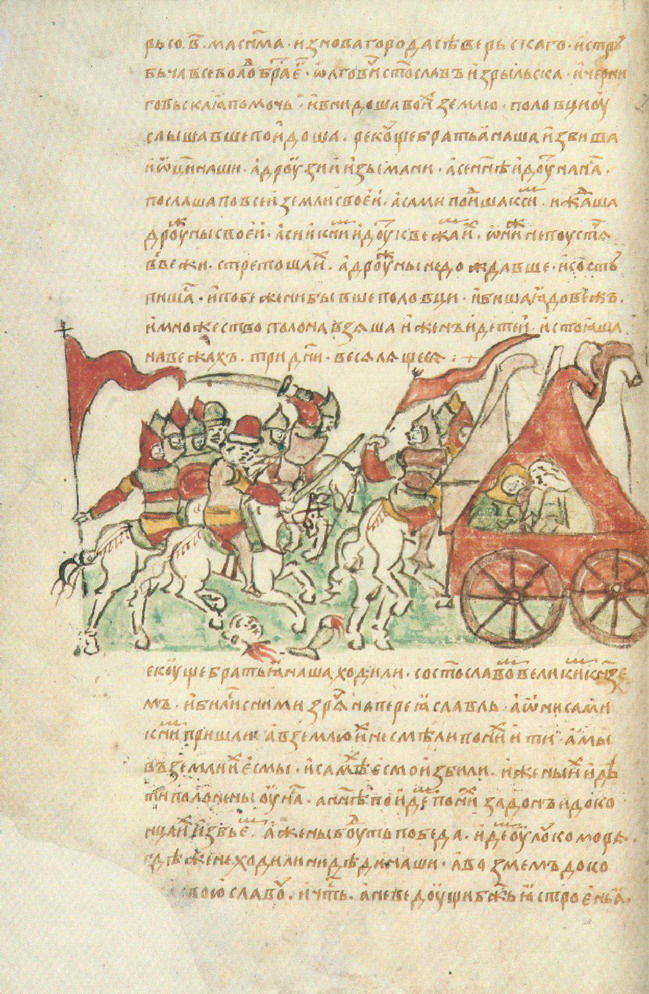
463

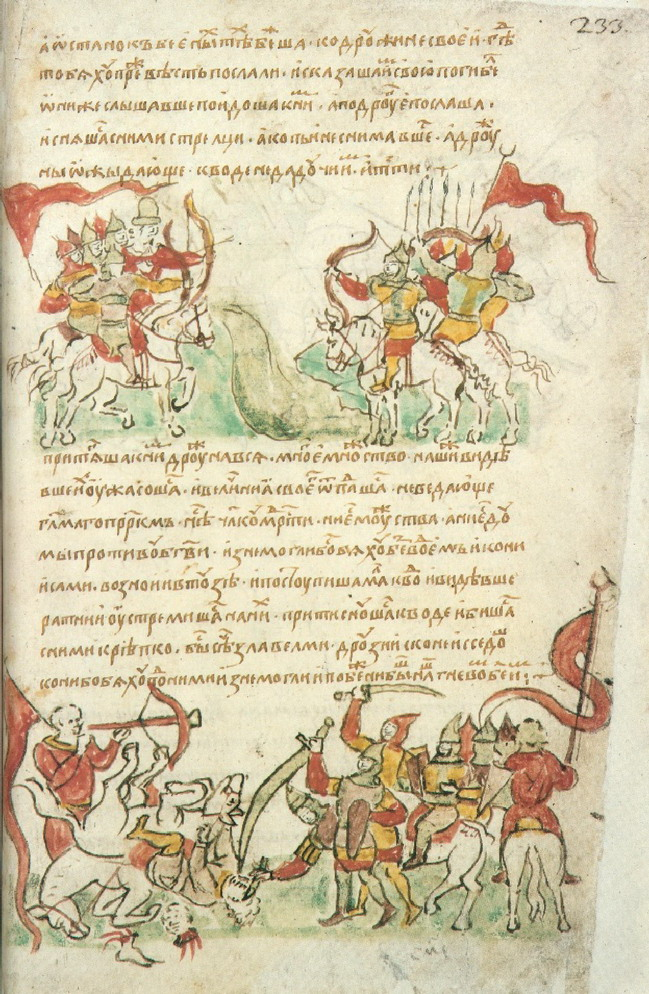
464

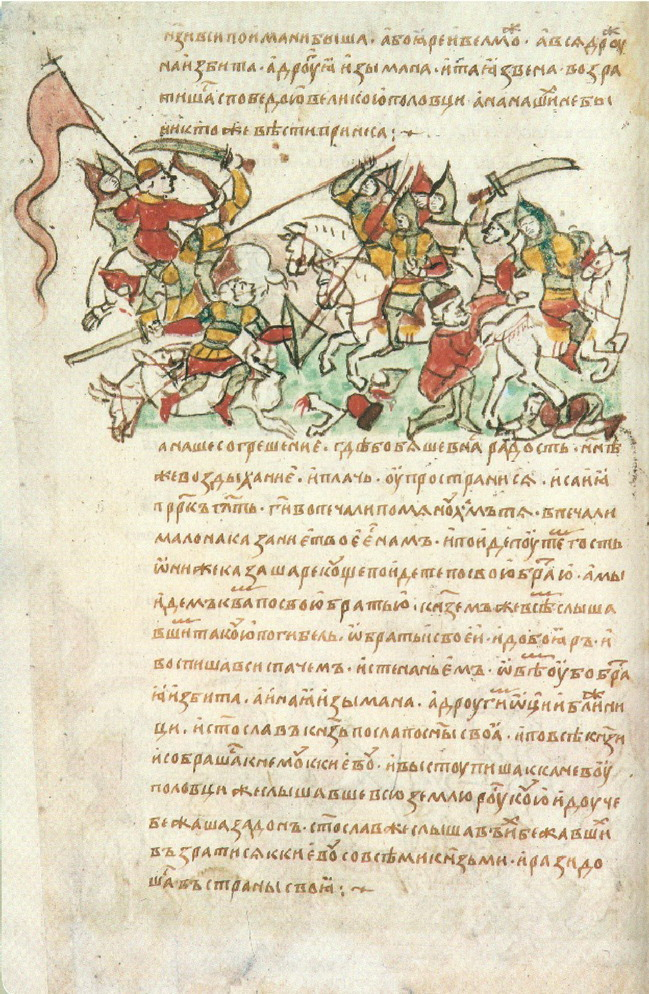
465

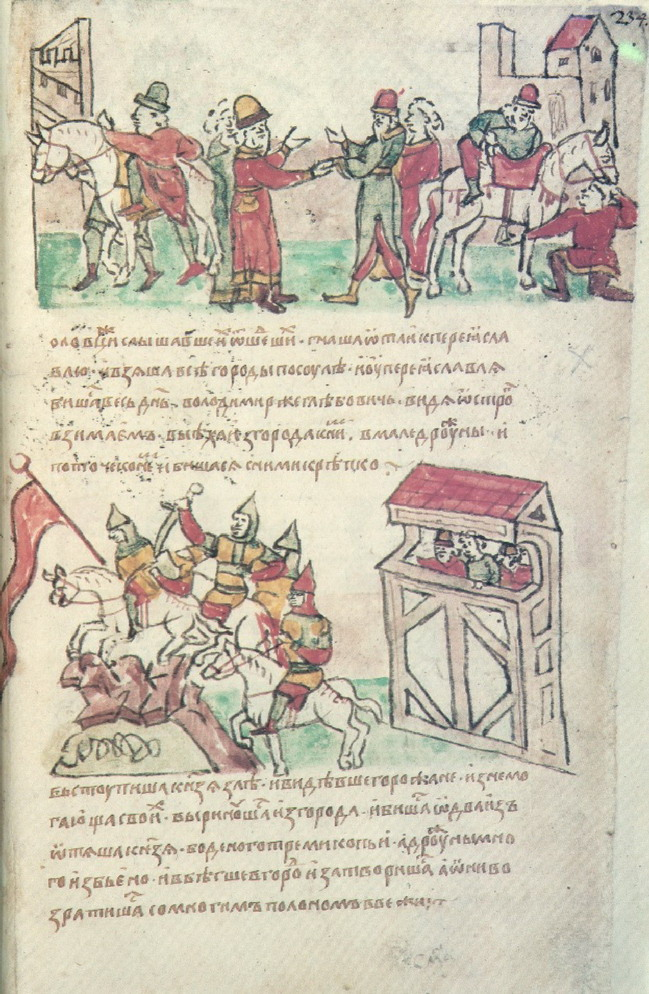
466

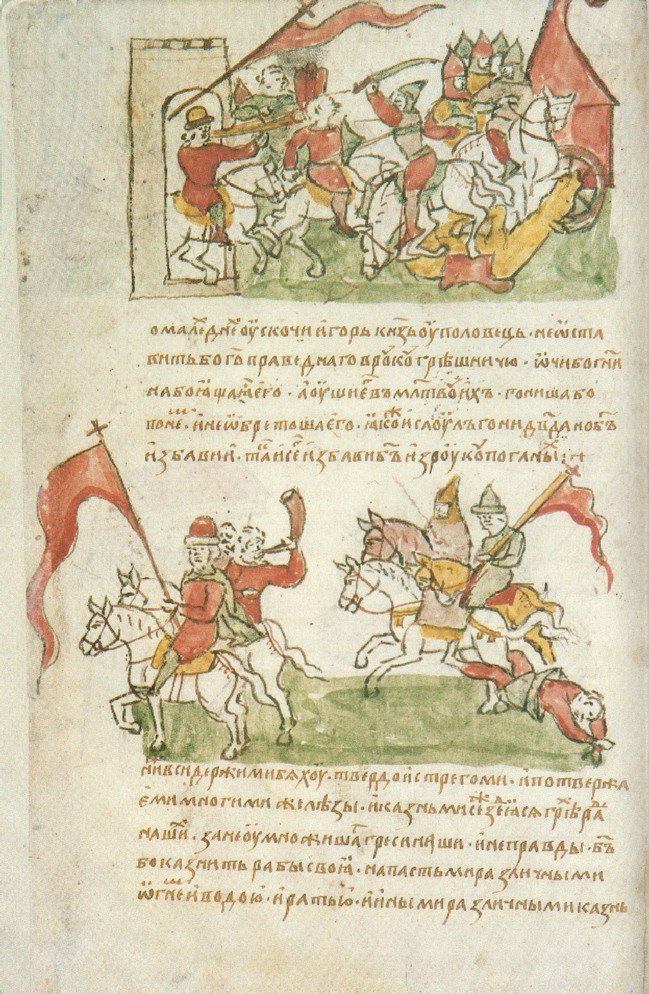
467

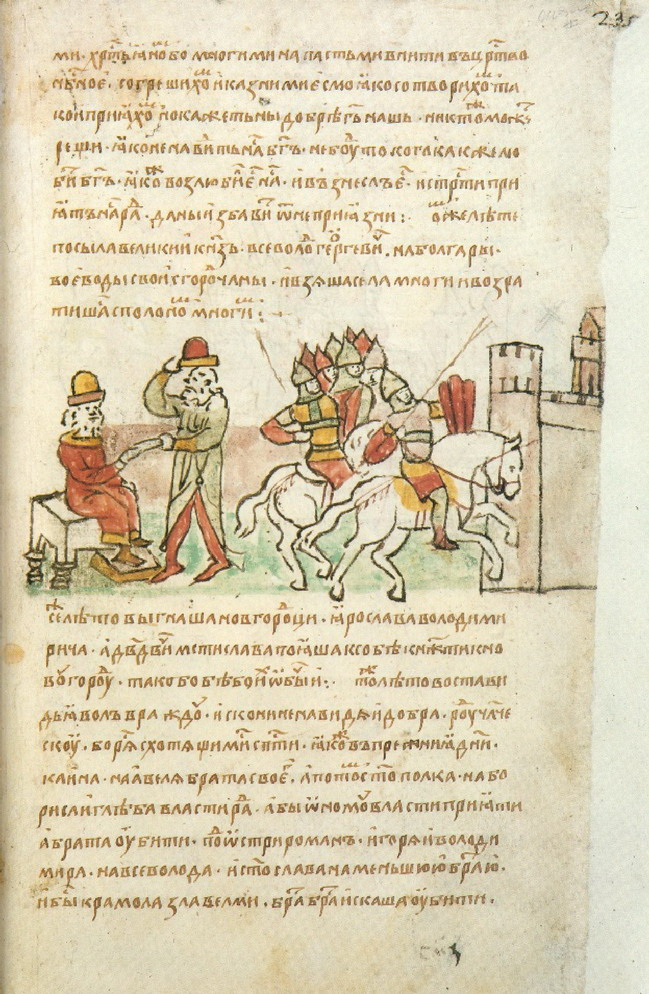
468

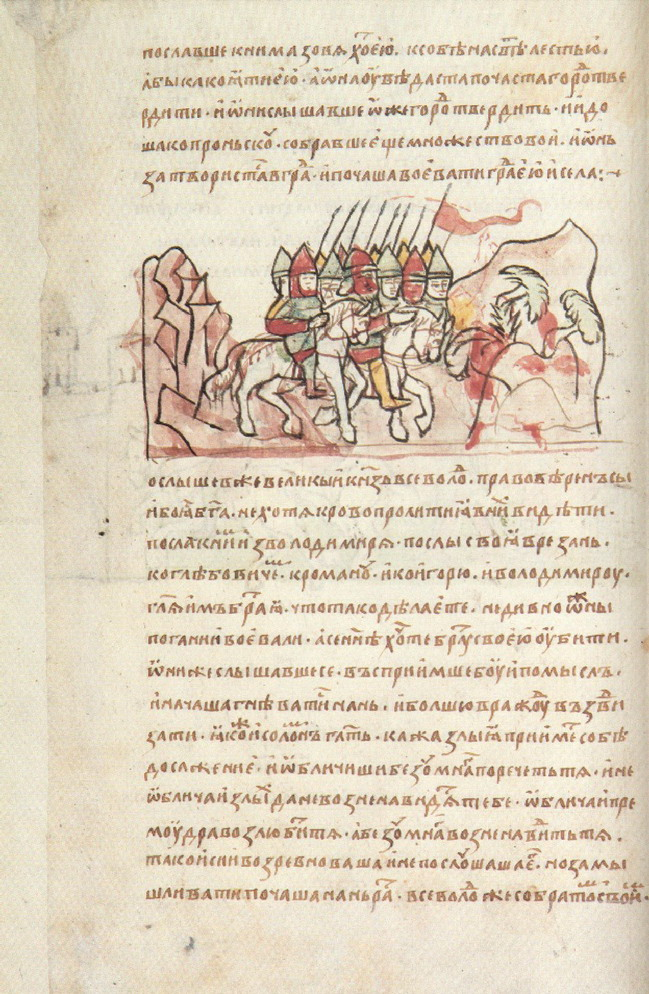
469

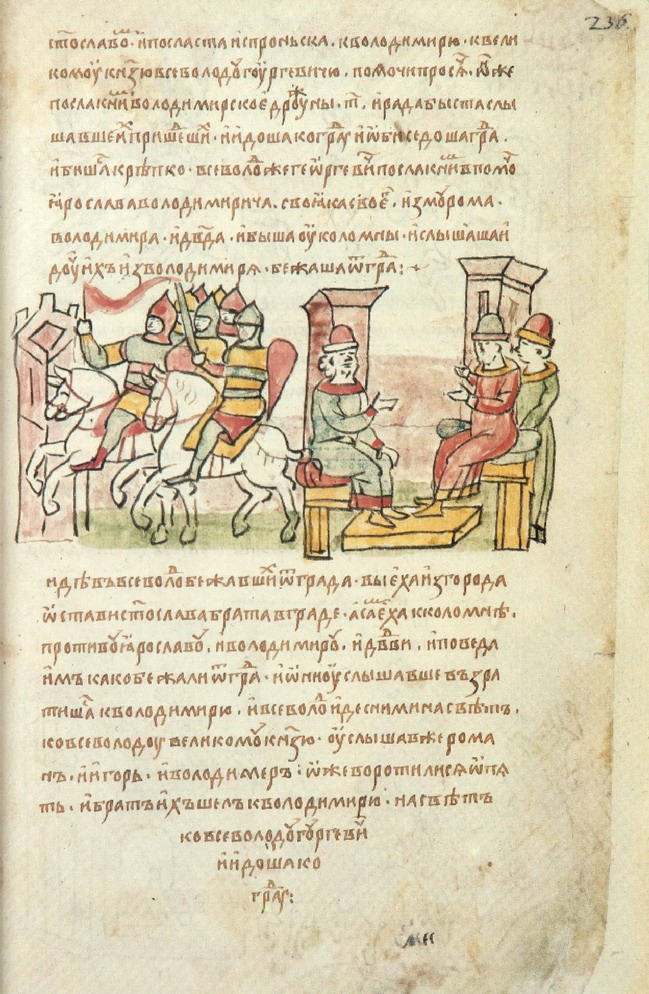
470

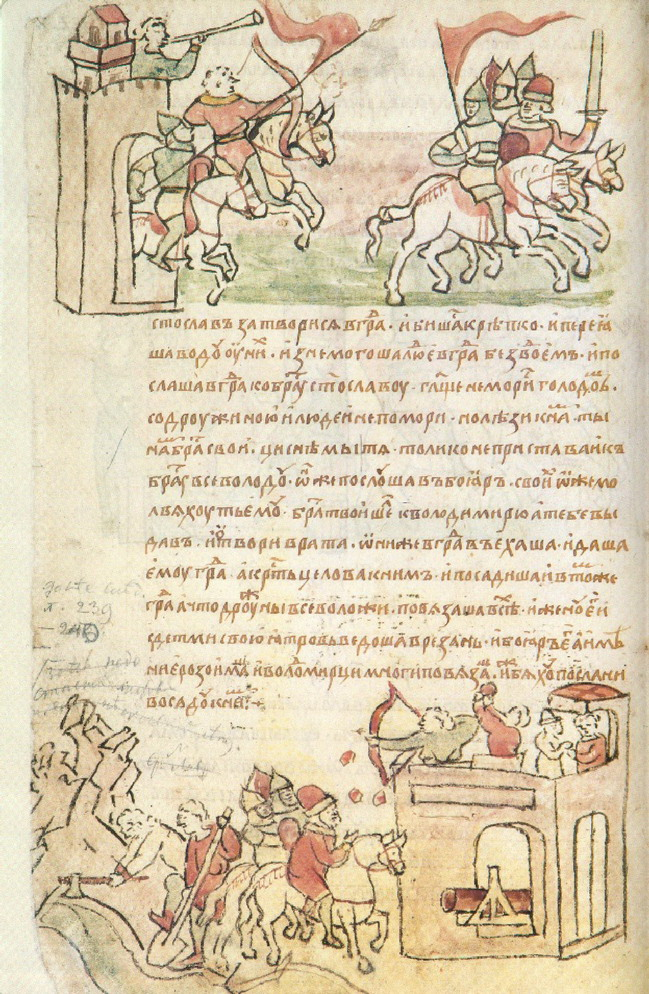
471

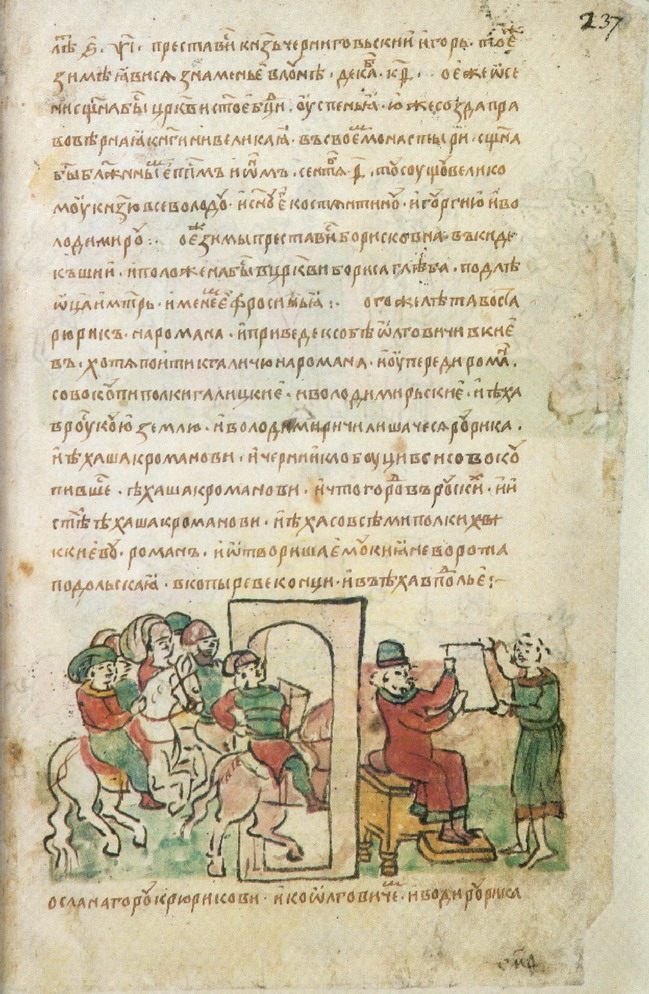
472

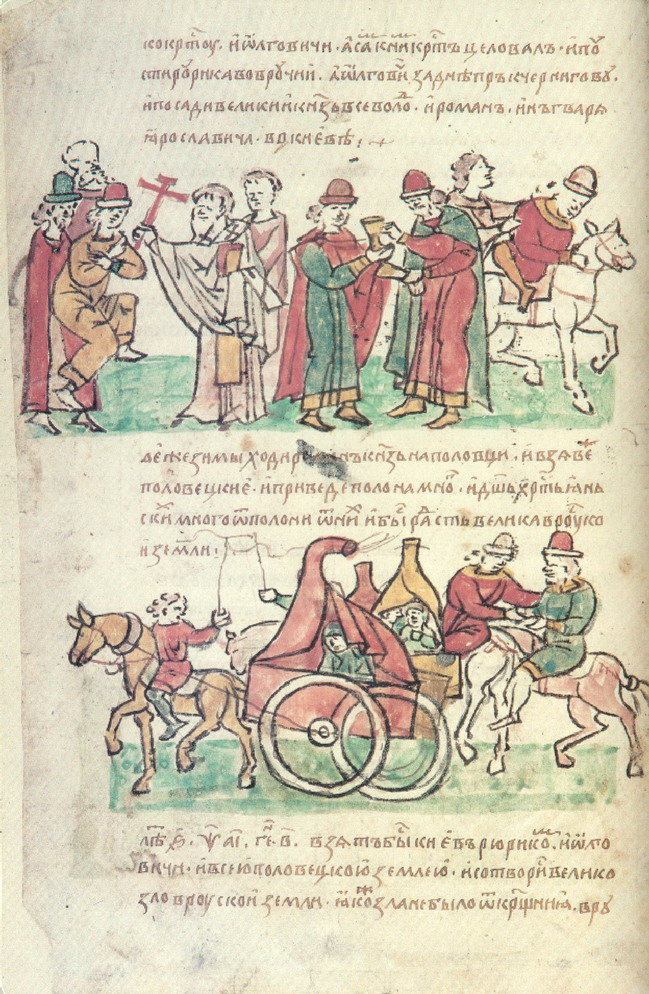
473

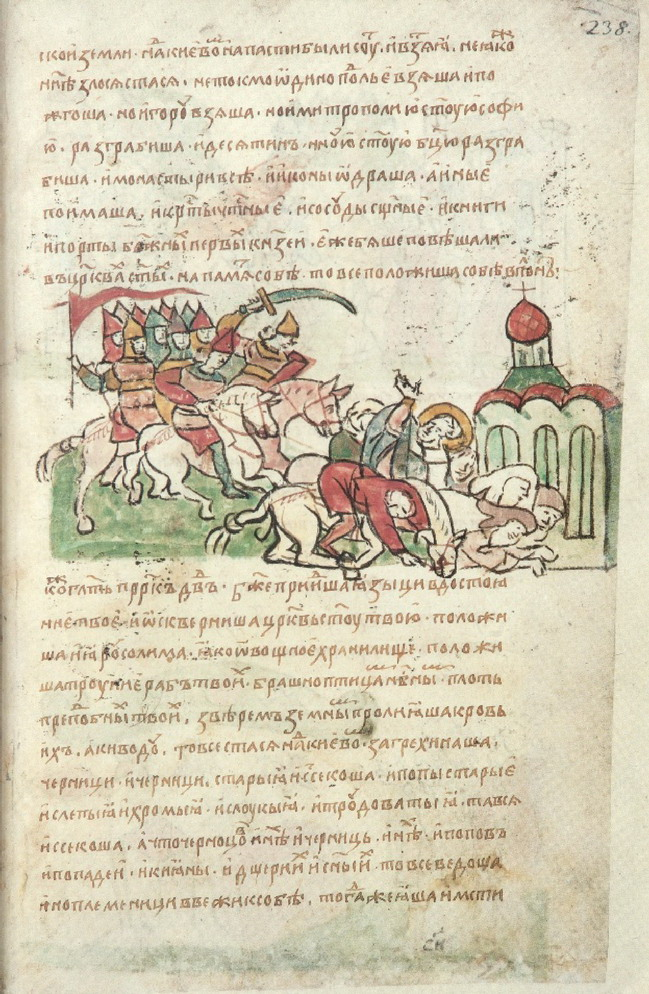
474

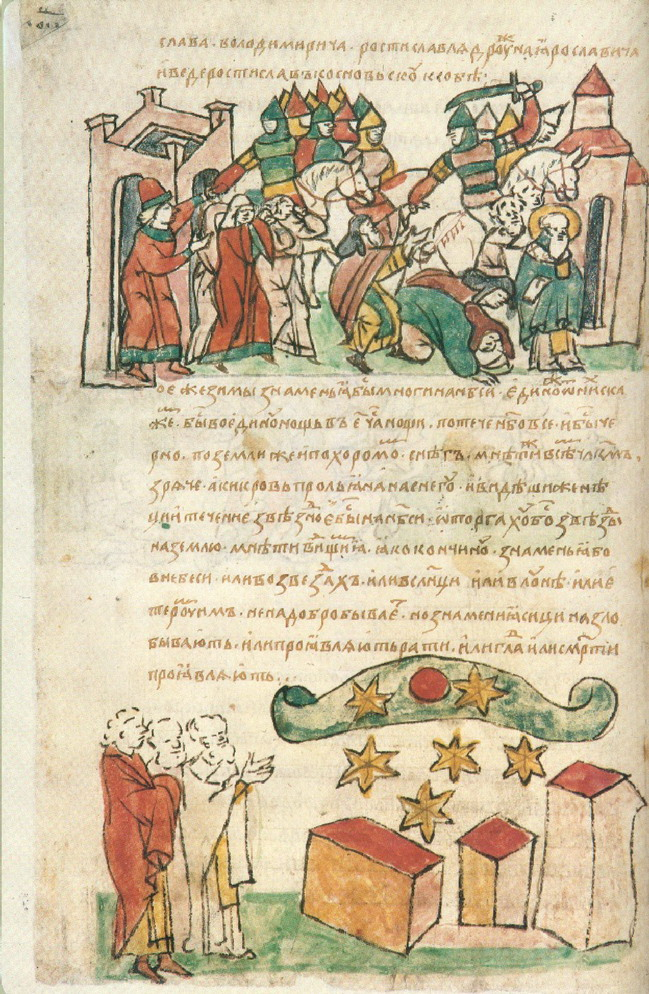
475

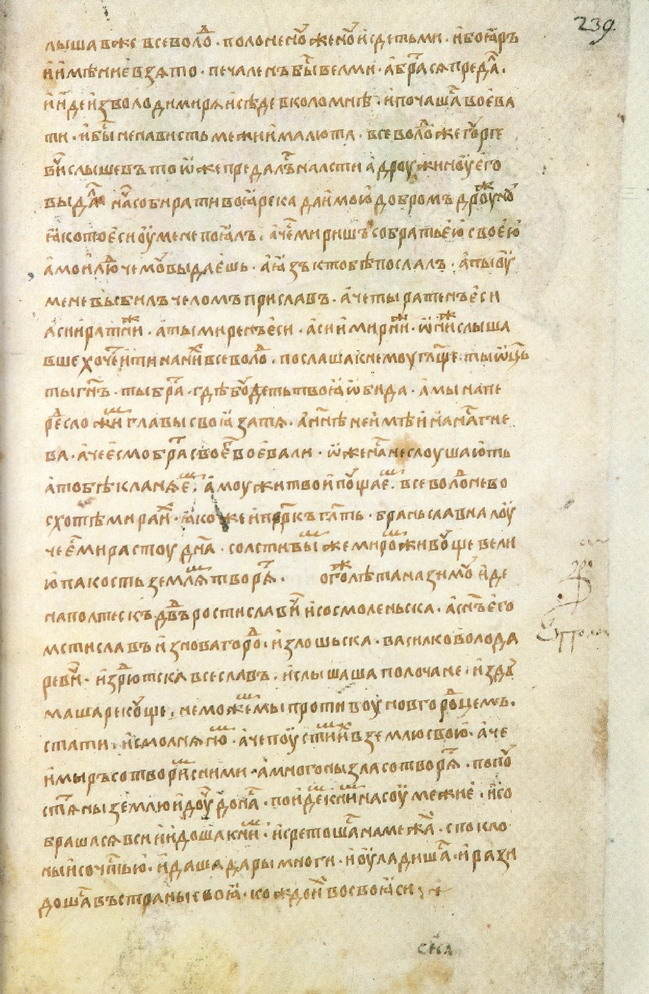
476

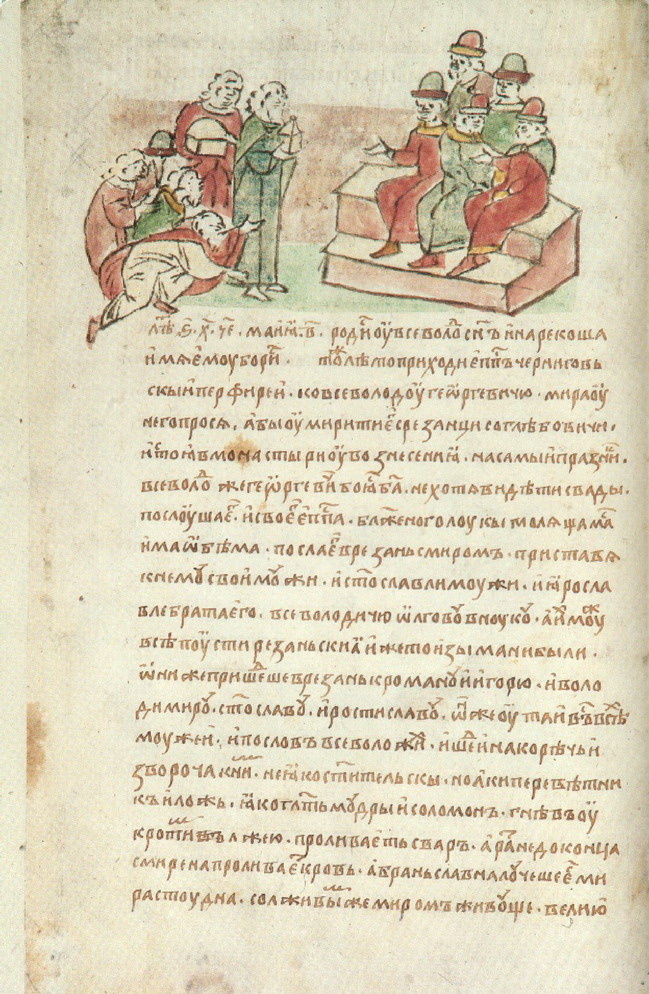
477

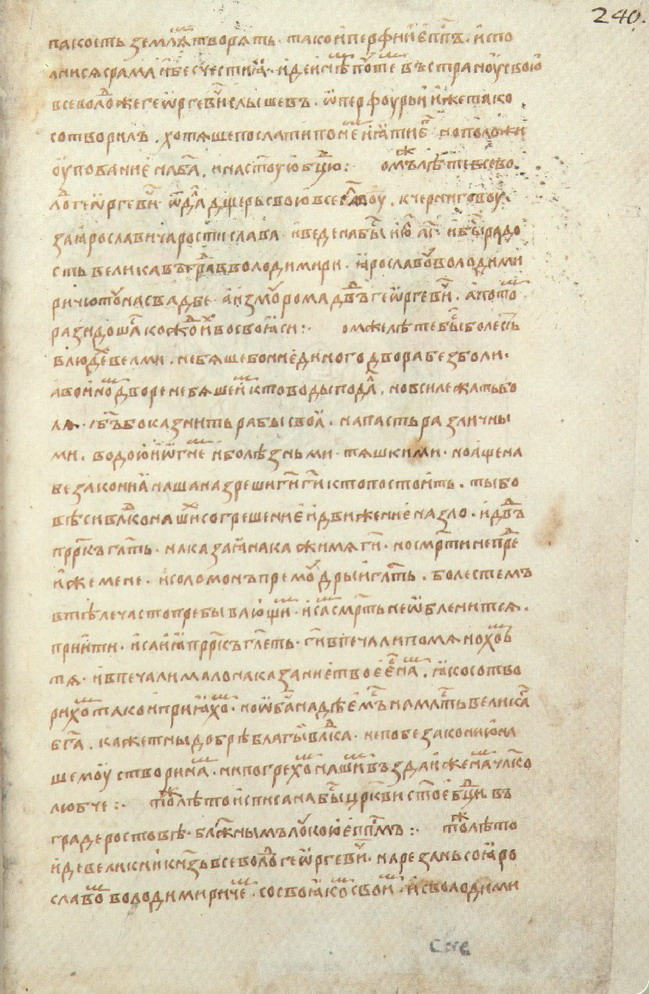
478

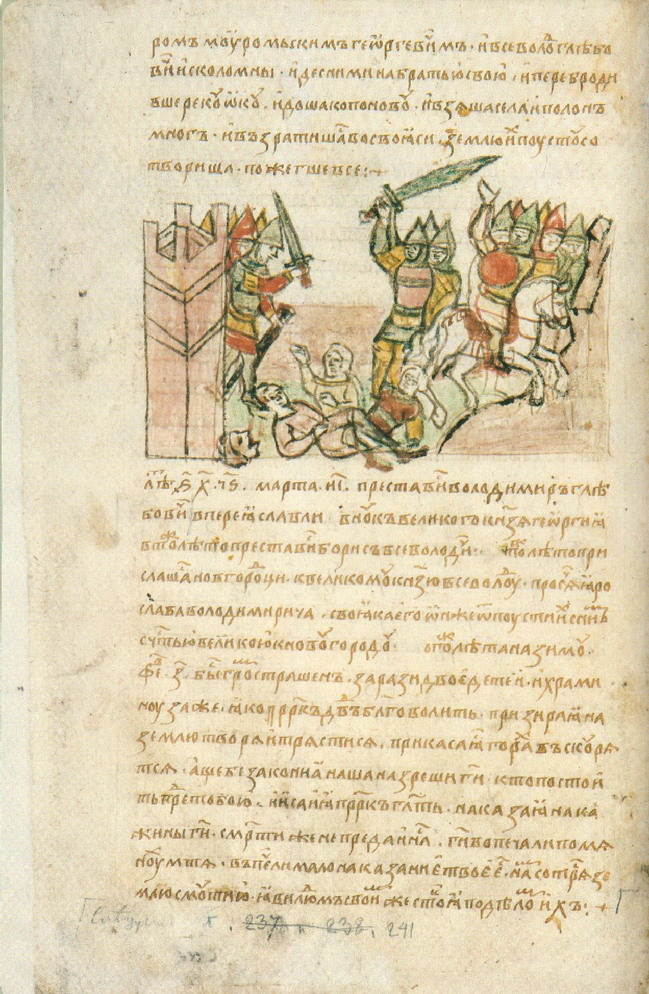
479

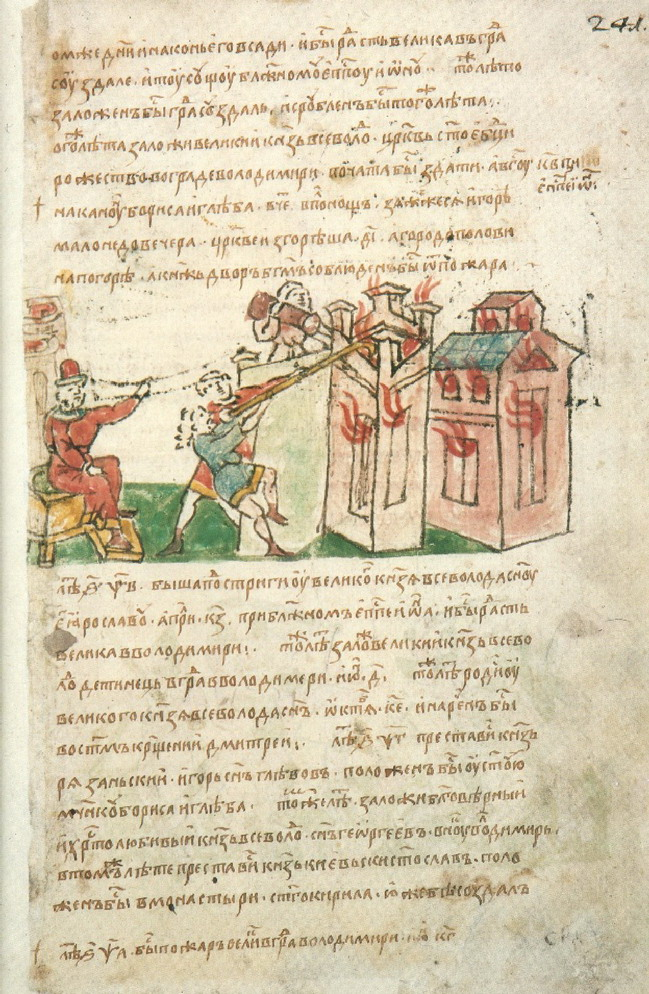
480

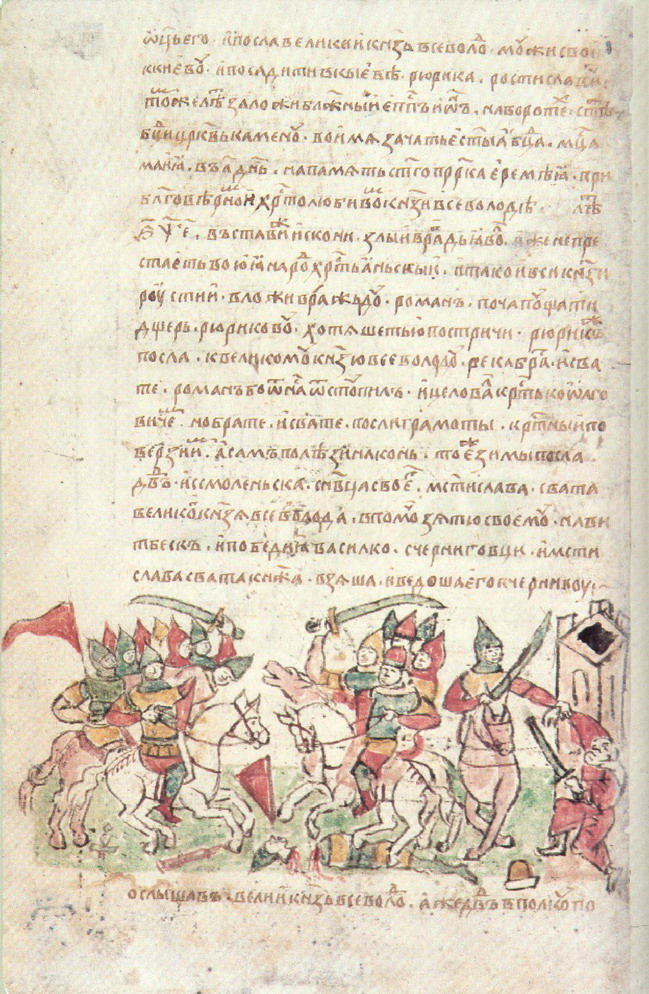
481

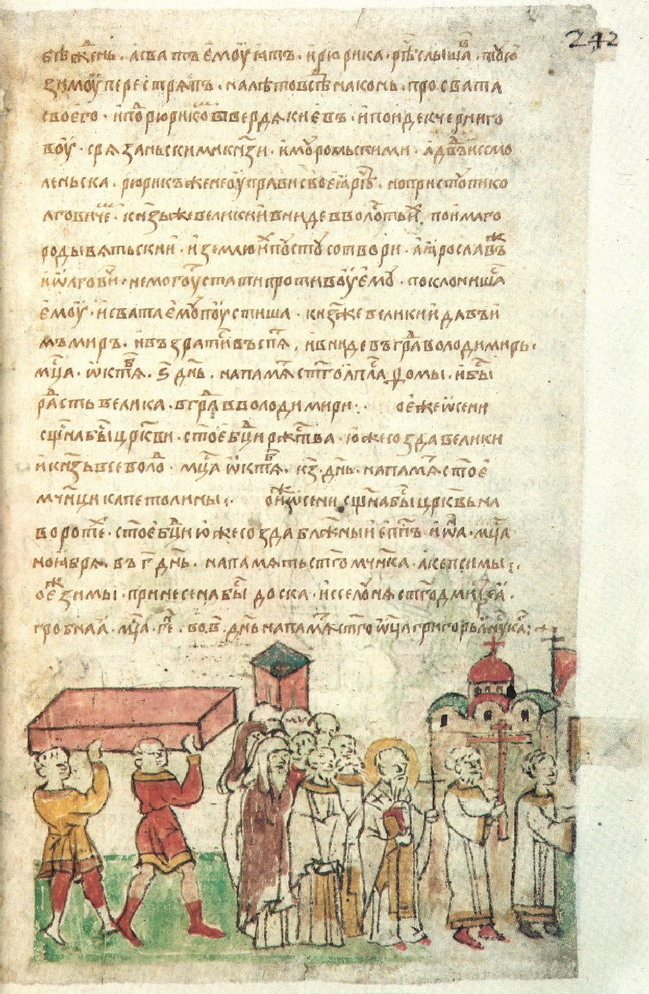
482

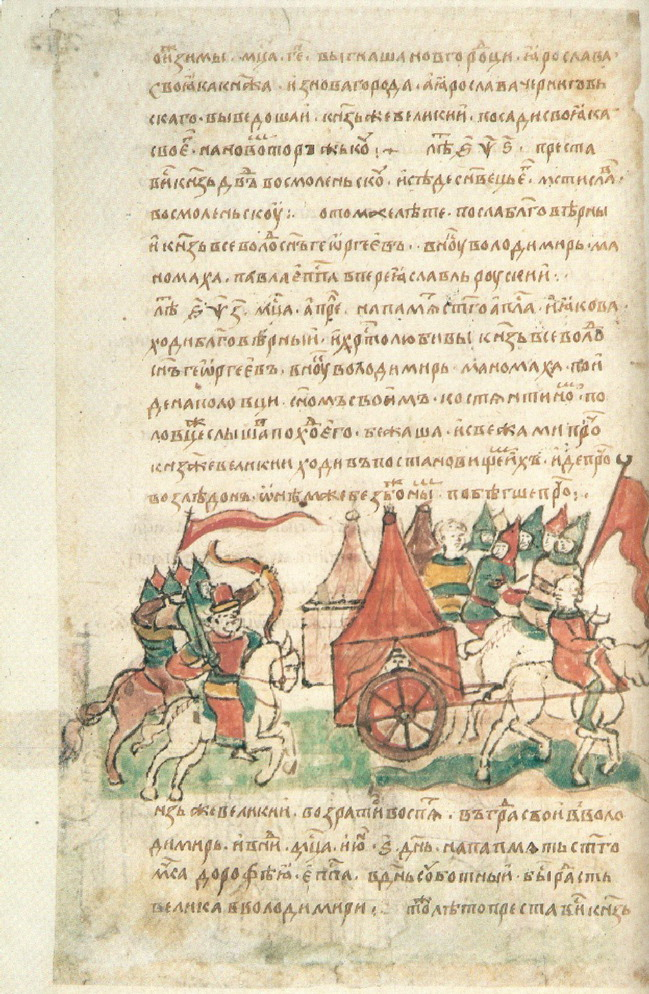
483

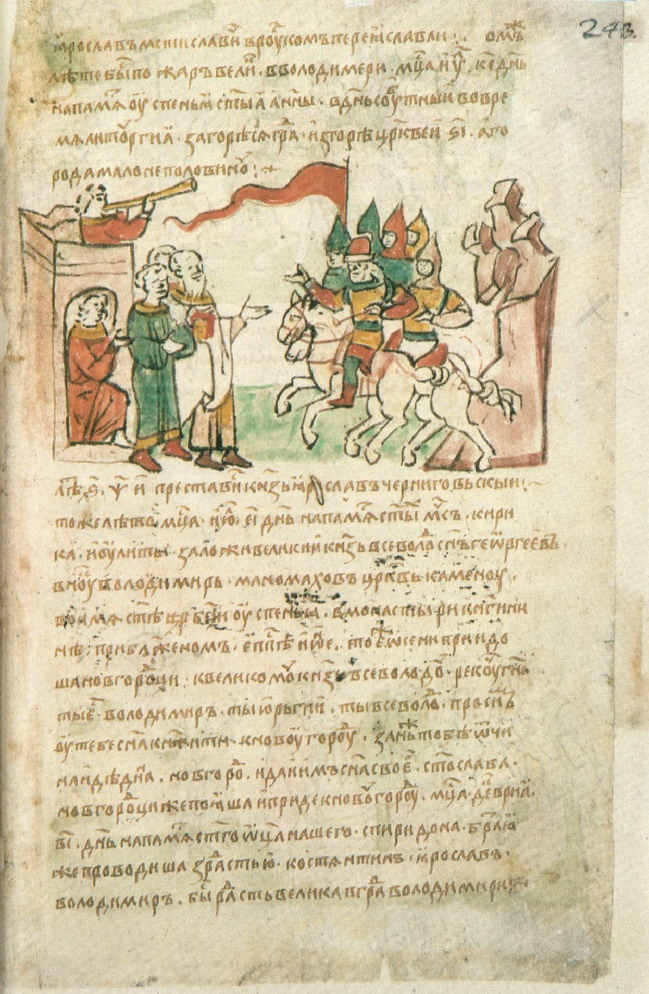
484

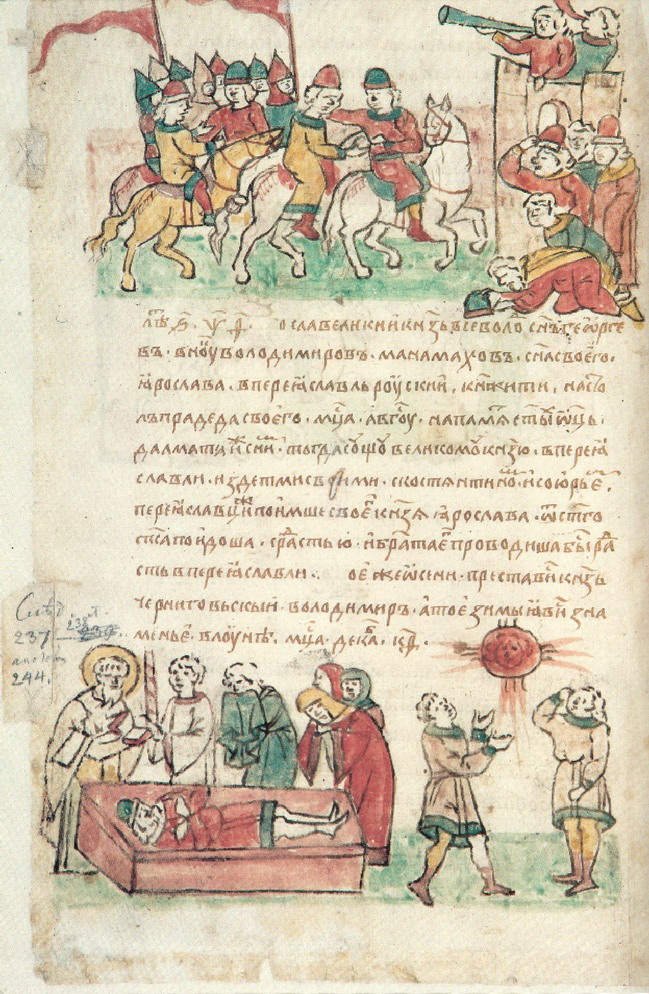
485

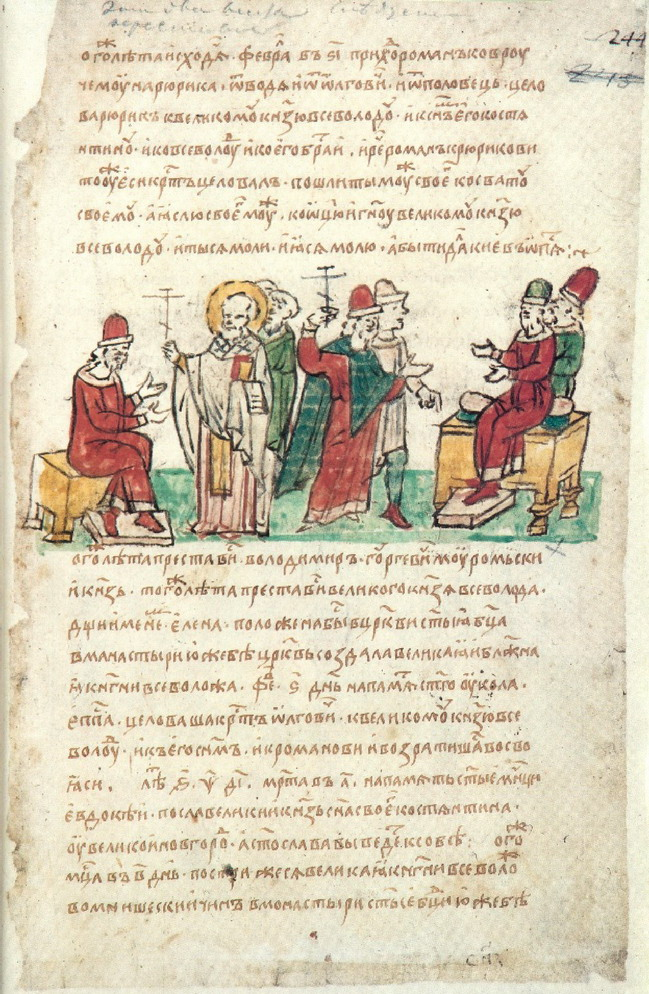
486

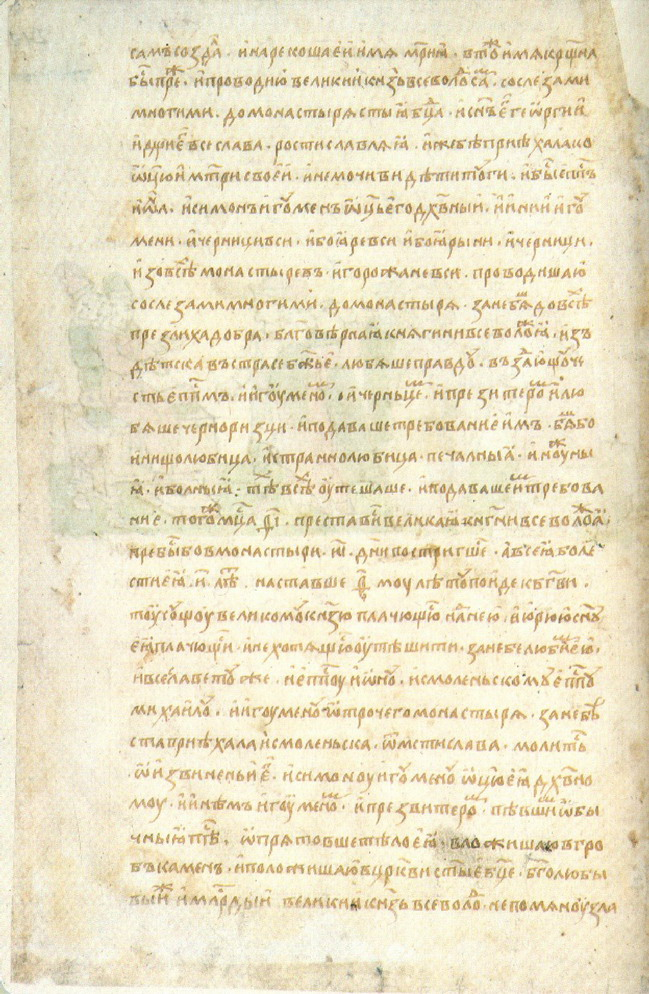
487

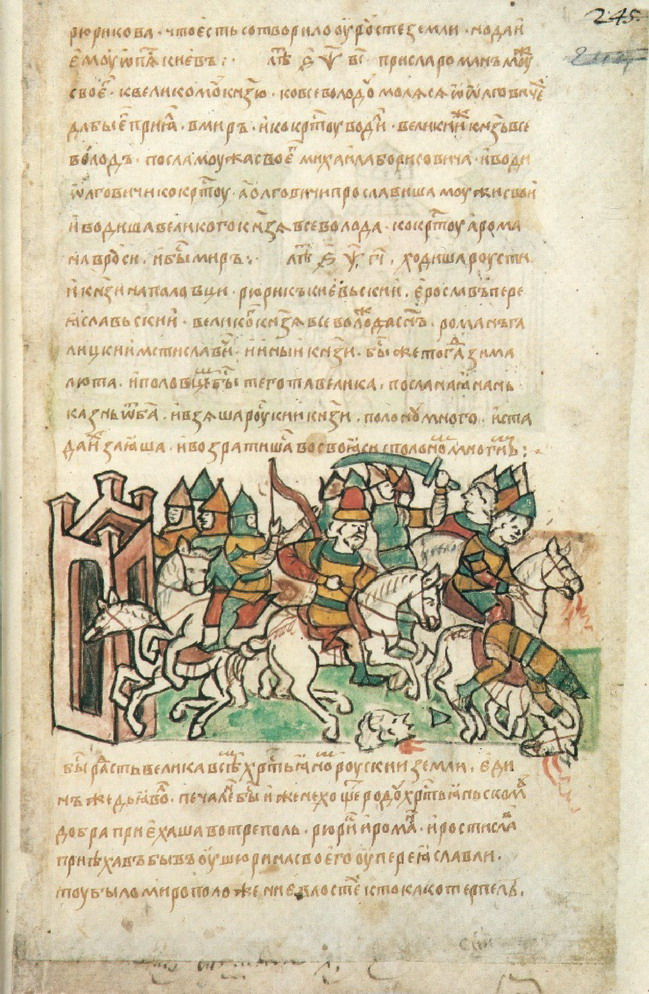
488

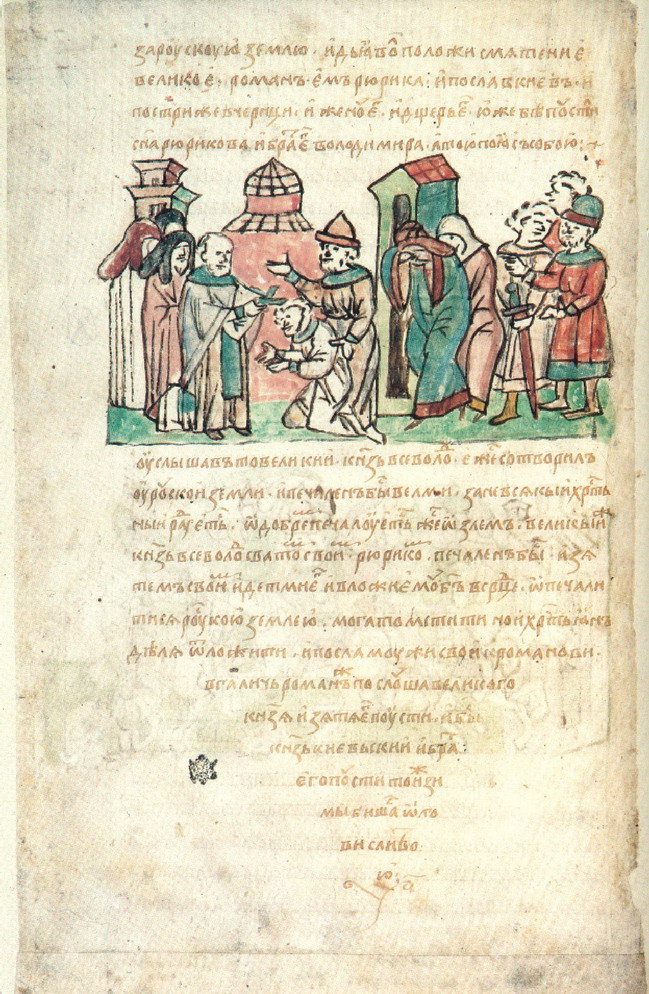
489

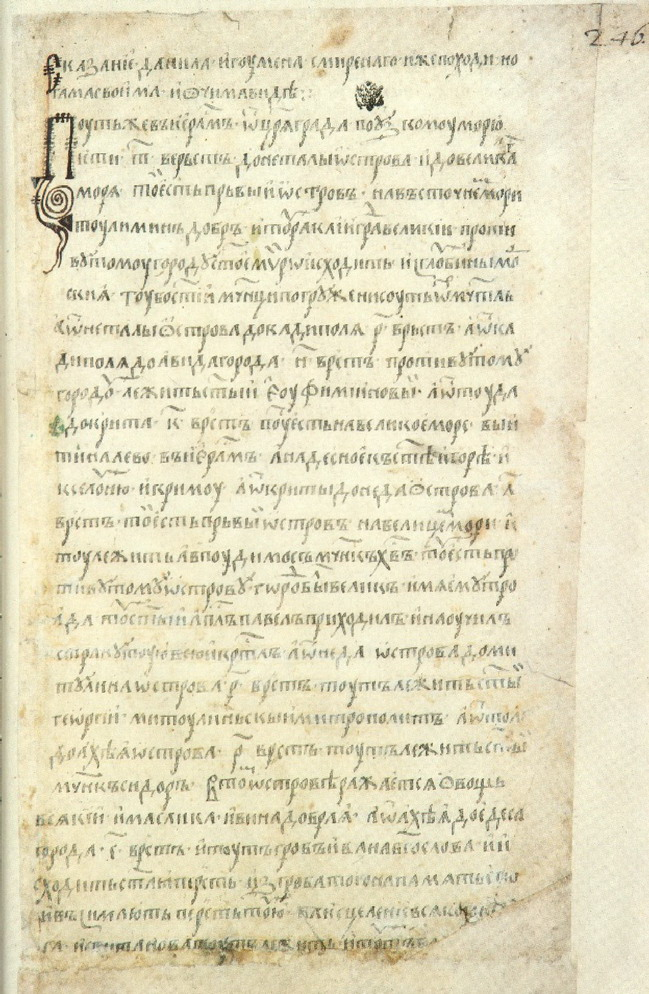
490

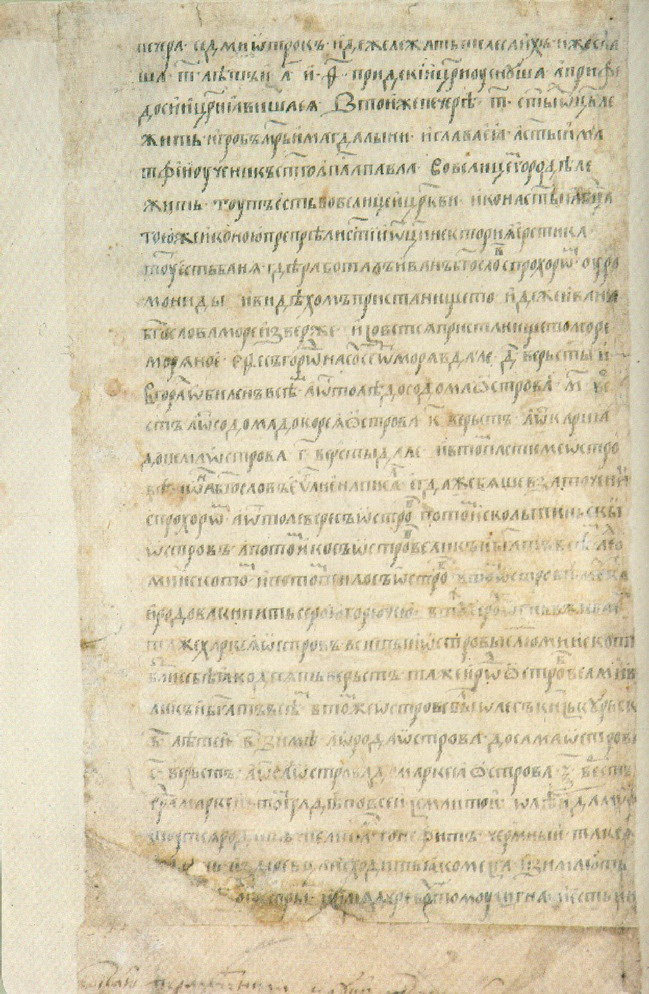
491

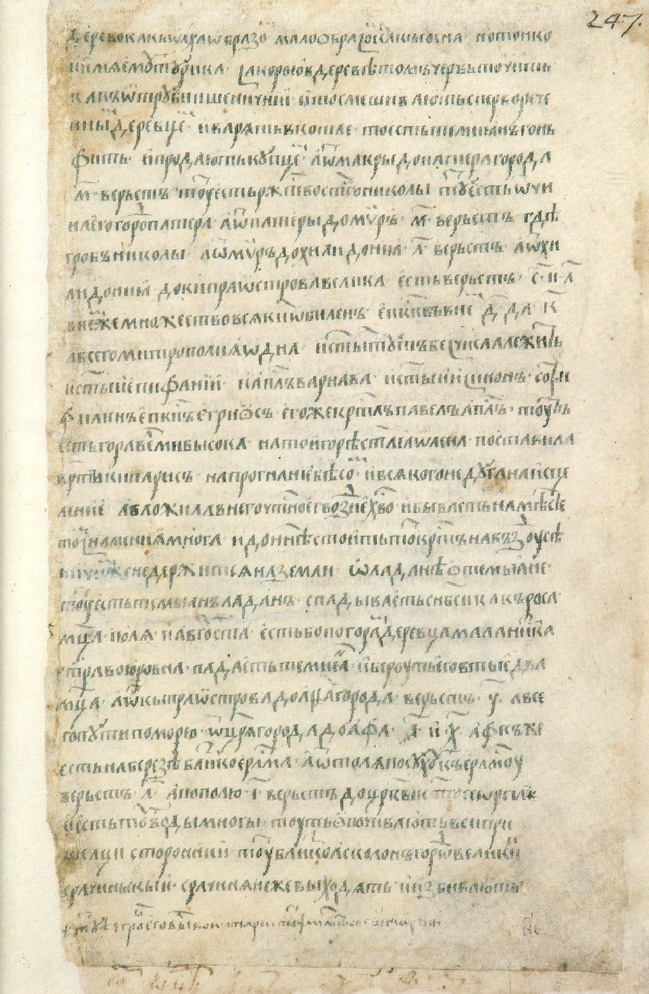
492

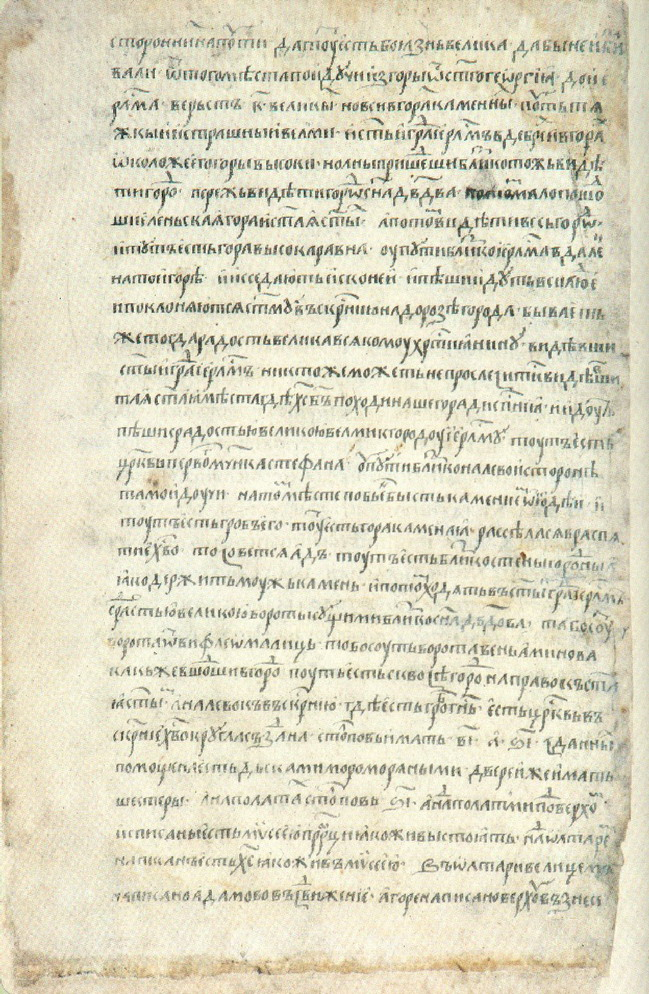
493

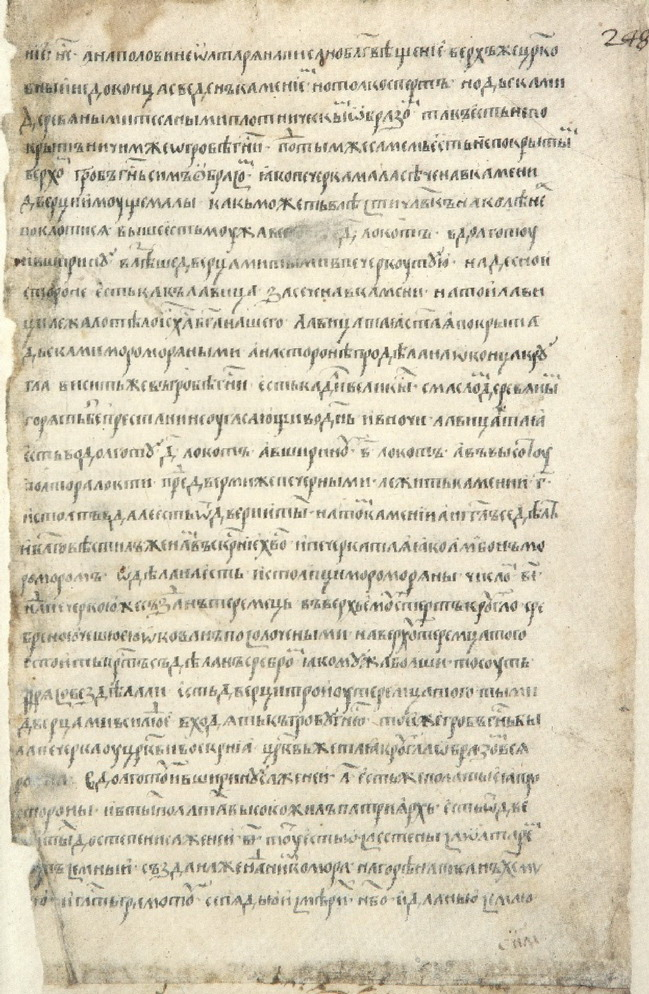
494

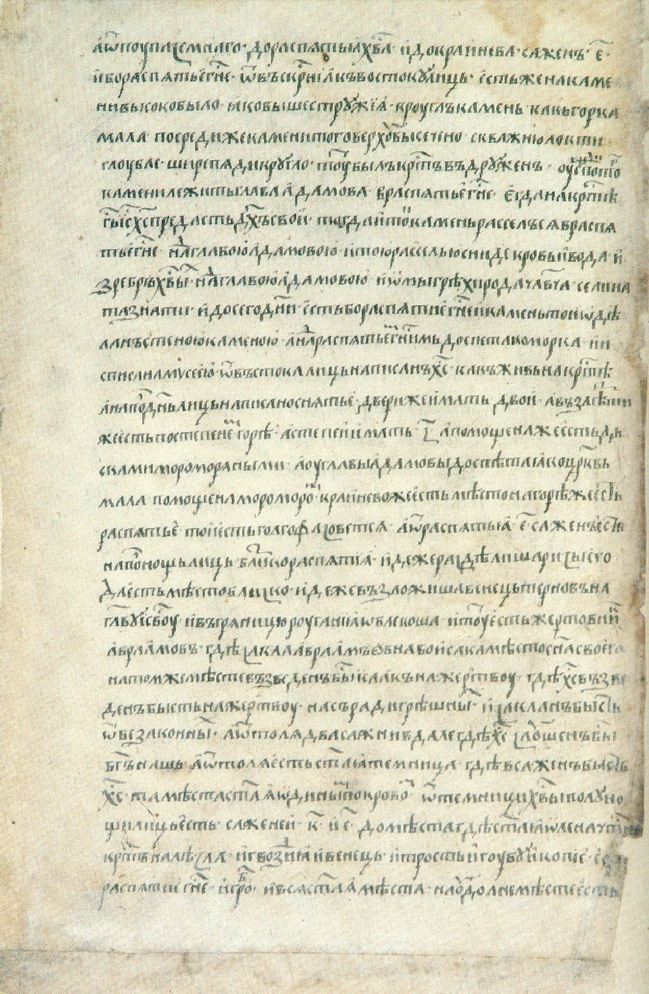
495

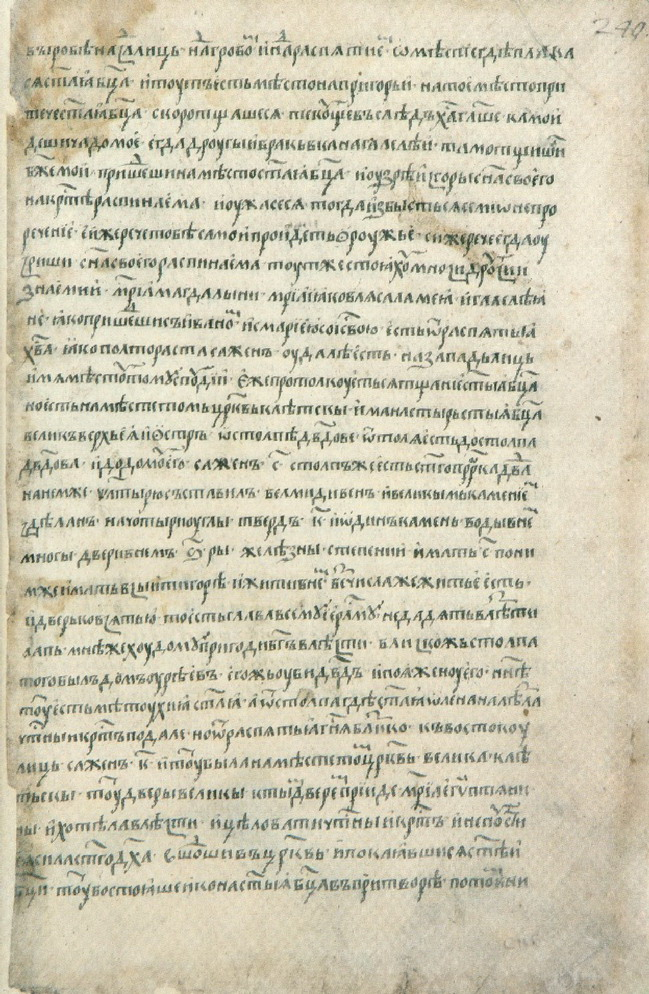
496

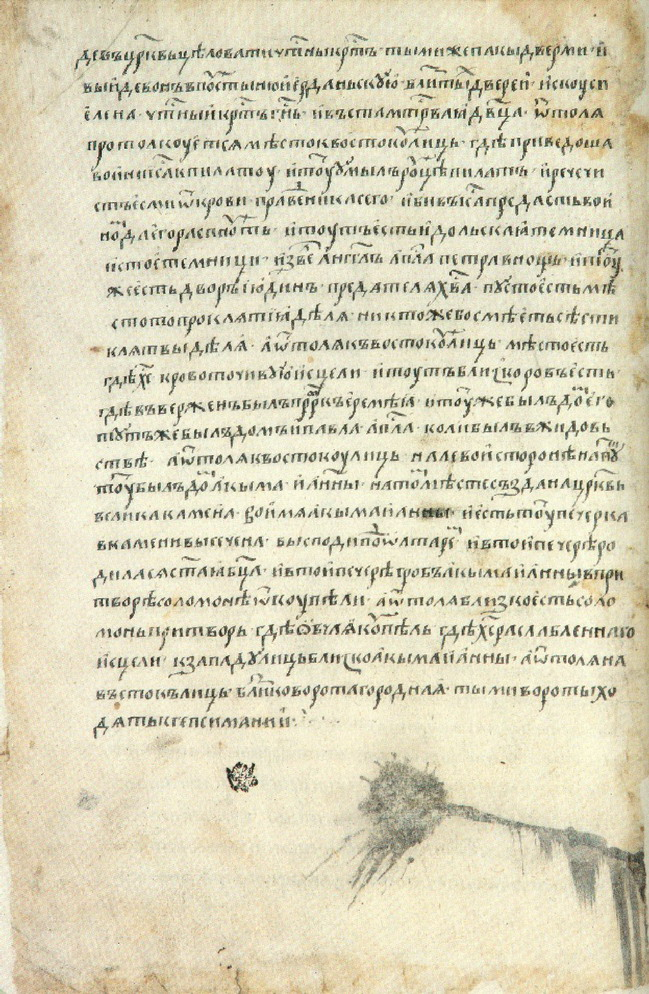
497

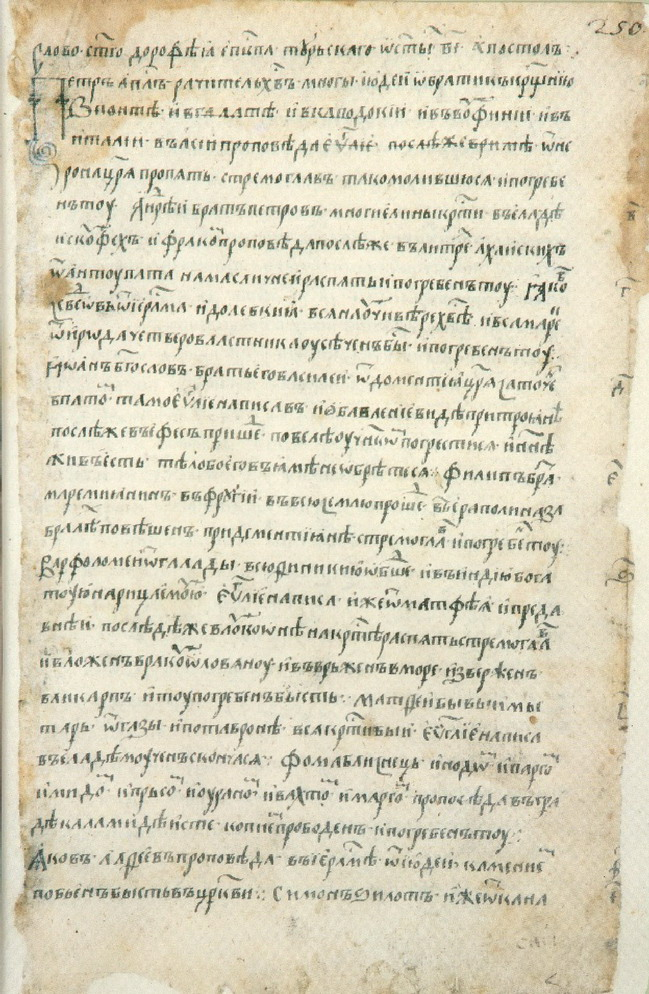
498

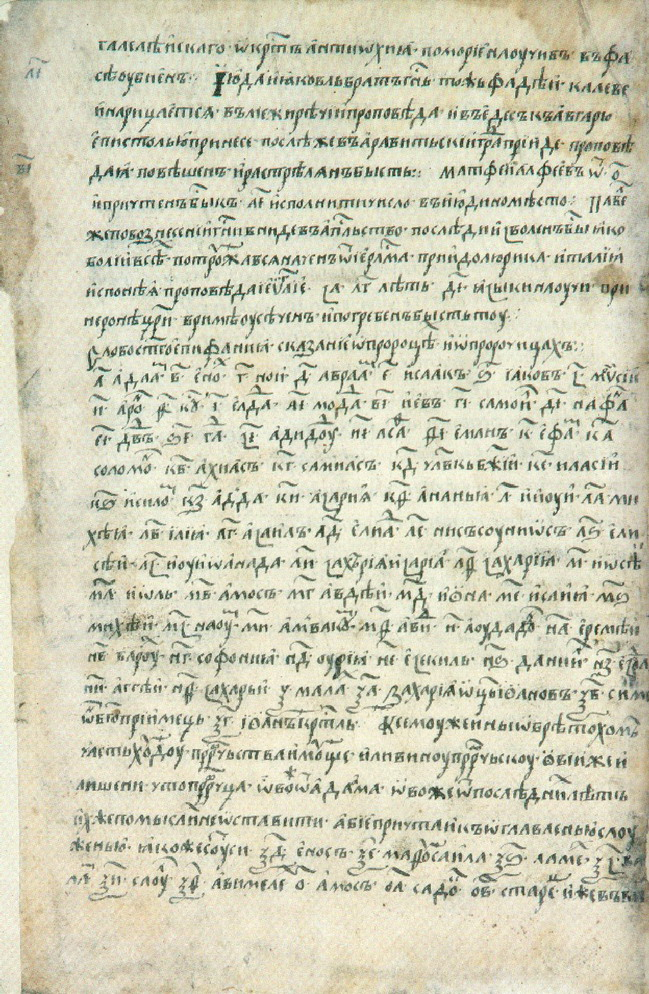
499

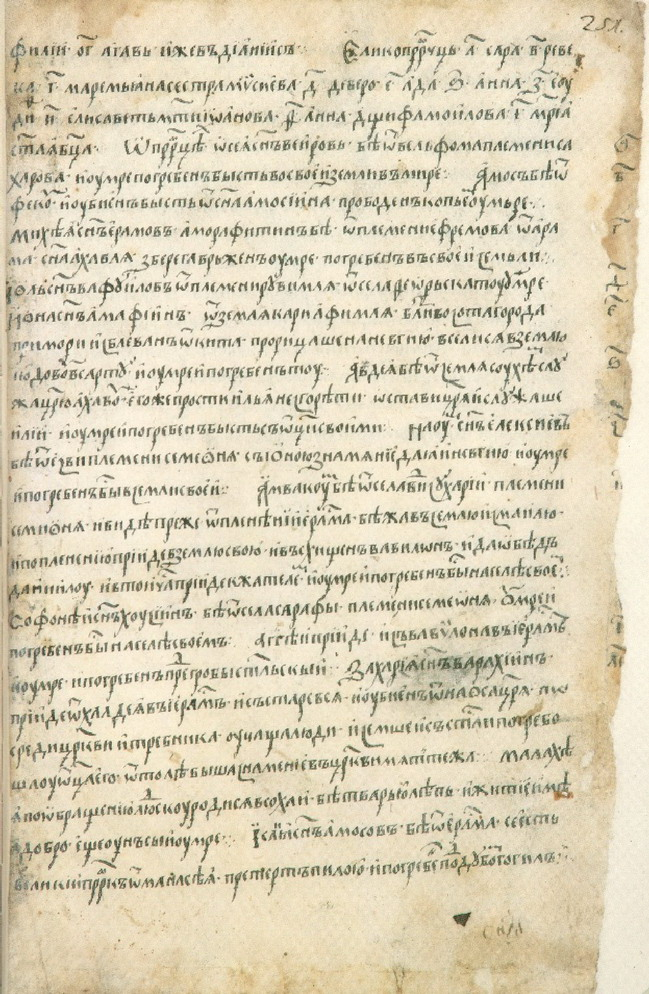
500

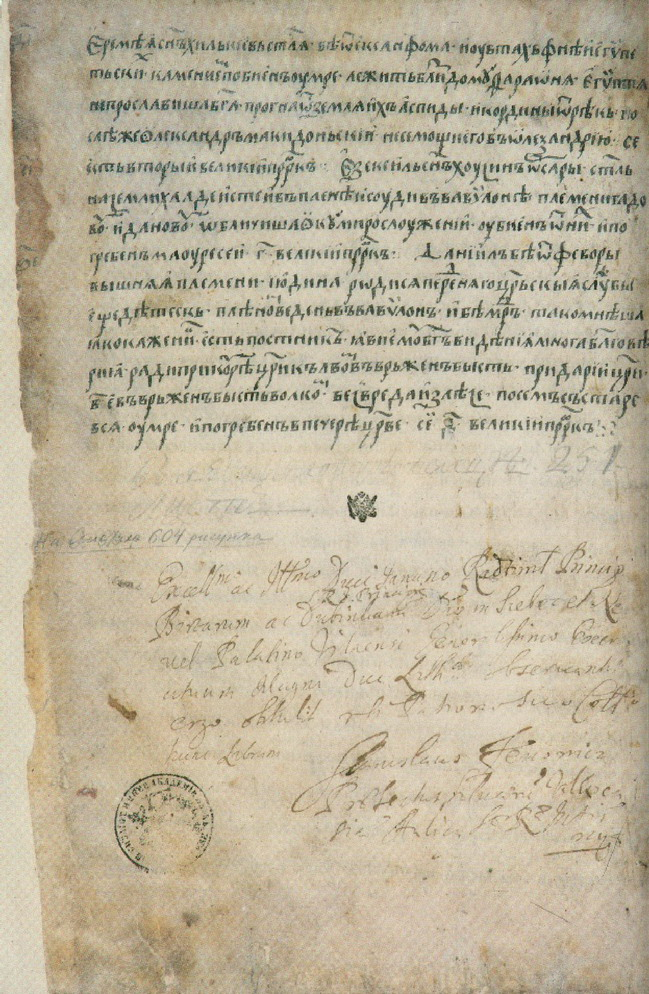
501

== See also ==
- Academic Chronicle
- Illustrated Chronicle of Ivan the Terrible

== Bibliography ==
=== Primary sources ===
- Iroshnikov, M. P.; Kukushkina, M. V.; Lurie, Y. S. (1989). Том Тридцать Восьмой: Радзивиловская Летопись [Volume Thirty-Eight: Radziwiłł Chronicle]. Complete Collection of Russian Chronicles (PSRL). M. D. Priselkov, O. P. Likhacheva, R. M. Mavrodina, E. K. Piotrovskaya. Leningrad (Saint Petersburg): Nauka. p. 179.

=== Literature ===
- Butler, Francis (2012). "The "Legend of Gorislava" (not "Rogned'" or "Rogneda"): An Edition, Commentary, and Translation". Dubitando: Studies in History and Culture in Honor of Donald Ostrowski (PDF). Bloomington: Slavica Publishers. pp. 335–352. ISBN 9780893574048.
- Gippius, Alexey A. (2014). "Reconstructing the original of the Povesť vremennyx let: a contribution to the debate". Russian Linguistics. 38 (3). Springer: 341–366. doi:10.1007/s11185-014-9137-y. JSTOR 43945126. S2CID 255017212.
- Maiorov, Alexander V. (November 2018). ""I Would Sacrifice Myself for my Academy and its Glory!" August Ludwig von Schlözer and the Discovery of the Hypatian Chronicle". Russian History. 45 (4). Brill: 319–340. doi:10.1163/18763316-04504002. JSTOR 27072372.
- Thuis, Hans (2015). Nestorkroniek. De oudste geschiedenis van het Kievse Rijk (in Dutch). Nijmegen: Uitgeverij Vantilt. p. 304. ISBN 9789460042287.
- Timberlake, Alan (2000). "Who Wrote the Laurentian Chronicle (1177–1203)?". Zeitschrift für Slavische Philologie. 59 (2). Universitätsverlag WINTER: 237–265.
- Tolochko, Oleksiy (2016-09-13), "Radziwiłł Chronicle", Encyclopedia of the Medieval Chronicle, Brill
- Tolochko, Oleksiy (2013). "Notes on the Radziwiłł Codex" (PDF). Studi Slavistici. X. Firenze University Press: 29–42.
